= Network synthesis filters =

Electronic filters designed by the network synthesis method

In signal processing, network synthesis filters are filters designed by the network synthesis method. The method has produced several important classes of filter including the Butterworth filter, the Chebyshev filter and the elliptic filter. It was originally intended to be applied to the design of passive linear analogue filters but its results can also be applied to implementations in active filters and digital filters. The essence of the method is to obtain the component values of the filter from a given rational function representing the desired transfer function.

== Description of method ==
The method can be viewed as the inverse problem of network analysis. Network analysis starts with a network and by applying the various electric circuit theorems predicts the response of the network. Network synthesis on the other hand, starts with a desired response and its methods produce a network that outputs, or approximates to, that response.

Network synthesis was originally intended to produce filters of the kind formerly described as wave filters but now usually just called filters. That is, filters whose purpose is to pass waves of certain frequencies while rejecting waves of other frequencies. Network synthesis starts out with a specification for the transfer function of the filter, H(s), as a function of complex frequency, s. This is used to generate an expression for the input impedance of the filter (the driving point impedance) which then, by expansion in simple continued fractions or partial fractions results in the required values of the filter components. In a digital implementation of a filter, H(s) can be implemented directly.

The advantages of the method are best understood by comparing it to the filter design methodology that was used before it, the image method. The image method considers the characteristics of an individual filter section in an infinite chain (ladder topology) of identical sections. The filters produced by this method suffer from inaccuracies due to the theoretical termination impedance, the image impedance, not generally being equal to the actual termination impedance. With network synthesis filters, the terminations are included in the design from the start. The image method also requires a certain amount of experience on the part of the designer. The designer must first decide how many sections and of what type should be used, and then after calculation, will obtain the transfer function of the filter. This may not be what is required and there can be a number of iterations. The network synthesis method, on the other hand, starts out with the required function and generates as output the sections needed to build the corresponding filter.

In general, the sections of a network synthesis filter are of identical topology (usually the simplest ladder type) but different component values are used in each section. By contrast, the structure of an image filter has identical values at each section, as a consequence of the infinite chain approach, but may vary the topology from section to section to achieve various desirable characteristics. Both methods make use of low-pass prototype filters followed by frequency transformations and impedance scaling to arrive at the final desired filter.

== Important filter classes ==
The class of a filter refers to the class of polynomials from which the filter is mathematically derived. The order of the filter is the number of filter elements present in the filter's ladder implementation. Generally speaking, the higher the order of the filter, the steeper the cut-off transition between passband and stopband. Filters are often named after the mathematician or mathematics on which they are based rather than the discoverer or inventor of the filter.

=== Butterworth filter ===
Butterworth filters are described as maximally flat, meaning that the response in the frequency domain is the smoothest possible curve of any class of filter of the equivalent order.

The Butterworth class of filter was first described in a 1930 paper by the British engineer Stephen Butterworth after whom it is named. The filter response is described by Butterworth polynomials, also due to Butterworth.

=== Chebyshev filter ===
A Chebyshev filter has a faster cut-off transition than a Butterworth, but at the expense of there being ripples in the frequency response of the passband. There is a compromise to be had between the maximum allowed attenuation in the passband and the steepness of the cut-off response. This is also sometimes called a type I Chebyshev, the type 2 being a filter with no ripple in the passband but ripples in the stopband. The filter is named after Pafnuty Chebyshev whose Chebyshev polynomials are used in the derivation of the transfer function.

=== Cauer filter ===
Cauer filters have equal maximum ripple in the passband and the stopband. The Cauer filter has a faster transition from the passband to the stopband than any other class of network synthesis filter. The term Cauer filter can be used interchangeably with elliptical filter, but the general case of elliptical filters can have unequal ripples in the passband and stopband. An elliptical filter in the limit of zero ripple in the passband is identical to a Chebyshev Type 2 filter. An elliptical filter in the limit of zero ripple in the stopband is identical to a Chebyshev Type 1 filter. An elliptical filter in the limit of zero ripple in both passbands is identical to a Butterworth filter. The filter is named after Wilhelm Cauer and the transfer function is based on elliptic rational functions. Cauer-type filters use generalized continued fractions.

=== Bessel filter ===
The Bessel filter has a maximally flat time-delay (group delay) over its passband. This gives the filter a linear phase response and results in it passing waveforms with minimal distortion. The Bessel filter has minimal distortion in the time domain due to the phase response with frequency as opposed to the Butterworth filter which has minimal distortion in the frequency domain due to the attenuation response with frequency. The Bessel filter is named after Friedrich Bessel and the transfer function is based on Bessel polynomials.

== Driving point impedance ==
Low-pass filter implemented as a ladder (Cauer) topology

The driving point impedance is a mathematical representation of the input impedance of a filter in the frequency domain using one of a number of notations such as Laplace transform (s-domain) or Fourier transform (jω-domain). Treating it as a one-port network, the expression is expanded using continued fraction or partial fraction expansions. The resulting expansion is transformed into a network (usually a ladder network) of electrical elements. Taking an output from the end of this network, so realized, will transform it into a two-port network filter with the desired transfer function.

Not every possible mathematical function for driving point impedance can be realized using real electrical components. Wilhelm Cauer (following on from R. M. Foster) did much of the early work on what mathematical functions could be realized and in which filter topologies. The ubiquitous ladder topology of filter design is named after Cauer.

There are a number of canonical forms of driving point impedance that can be used to express all (except the simplest) realizable impedances. The most well known ones are;

- Cauer's first form of driving point impedance consists of a ladder of shunt capacitors and series inductors and is most useful for low-pass filters.
- Cauer's second form of driving point impedance consists of a ladder of series capacitors and shunt inductors and is most useful for high-pass filters.
- Foster's first form of driving point impedance consists of parallel connected LC resonators (series LC circuits) and is most useful for band-pass filters.
- Foster's second form of driving point impedance consists of series connected LC anti-resonators (parallel LC circuits) and is most useful for band-stop filters.

Further theoretical work on realizable filters in terms of a given rational function as transfer function was done by Otto Brune in 1931 and Richard Duffin with Raoul Bott in 1949. The work was summarized in 2010 by John H. Hubbard. When a transfer function is specified as a positive-real function (the set of positive real numbers is invariant under the transfer function), then a network of passive components (resistors, inductors, and capacitors) can be designed with that transfer function.

== Impedance and admittance parameters ==
Impedance and admittance parameters may be derived from the driving point impedance. If Z(s) is the polynomial ratio of a known driving point impedance, them the following variables may be defined for use in the derivation of impedance parameters, (z parameters), and admittance parameters (y parameters). Z and y parameters are useful to simulate the frequency response without synthesized hardware, or to compute the coupling matrix of the network.

Let:

m1 = even terms of the numerator of Z(s)

n1 = odd terms of the numerator of Z(s)

m2 = even terms of the denominator of Z(s)

n2 = odd terms of the denominator of Z(s)

Then:

$$\begin{align}
\begin{array}{l}
\text{Case A:}                             &\text{Case B:}&\\
z_{11} = \frac{m_1}{n_2}                   &z_{11} = \frac{n_1}{m_2}  \\
z_{22} = \frac{m_2}{n_2}                   &z_{22} = \frac{n_2}{m_2}  \\
z_{12} = \frac{\sqrt{m_1m_2-n_1n_2}}{n_2}  &z_{12} = \frac{\sqrt{n_1n_2-m_1m_2}}{m_2}\\
y_{11} = \frac{n_2}{m_1}                   &y_{11} = \frac{m_2}{n_1}  \\
y_{22} = \frac{n_1}{m_1}                   &y_{22} = \frac{m_1}{n_1}  \\
y_{12} = \frac{\sqrt{n_1n_2-m_1m_2}}{m_1}  &y_{12} = \frac{\sqrt{m_1m_2-n_1n_2}}{n_1} \\
\end{array}\\
\end{align}$$

The polynomial square root process may be used to obtain z_{12} and y_{12} in complete polynomial form, assuming the polynomials under the square root are squared polynomials, which is not guaranteed. If y_{12} or z_{12} are not squared polynomials, they may be made squared by multiplying both the numerator and denominator with an auxiliary Hurwitz polynomial.

== Prototype filters ==
Prototype filters are used to make the process of filter design less labour-intensive. The prototype is usually designed to be a low-pass filter of unity nominal impedance and unity cut-off frequency, although other schemes are possible. The full design calculations from the relevant mathematical functions and polynomials are carried out only once. The actual filter required is obtained by a process of scaling and transforming the prototype.

Values of prototype elements are published in tables, one of the first being due to Sidney Darlington. Both modern computing power and the practice of directly implementing filter transfer functions in the digital domain have largely rendered this practice obsolete.

A different prototype is required for each order of filter in each class. For those classes in which there is attenuation ripple, a different prototype is required for each value of ripple. The same prototype may be used to produce filters which have a different bandform from the prototype. For instance low-pass, high-pass, band-pass and band-stop filters can all be produced from the same prototype.

== See also ==
- Linear filter
