= Richards' theorem =

Theorem in mathematics

In mathematics, Richards' theorem is a result due to Paul I. Richards in 1947. The theorem states that for

$$R(s) = \frac{kZ(s)-sZ(k)}{kZ(k)-sZ(s)},$$

if $Z(s)$ is a positive-real function (PRF) then $R(s)$ is a PRF for all real, positive values of $k$.

The theorem has applications in electrical network synthesis. The PRF property of an impedance function determines whether or not a passive network can be realised having that impedance. Richards' theorem led to a new method of realising such networks in the 1940s.

== Proof ==
$$R(s) = \frac{kZ(s)-sZ(k)}{kZ(k)-sZ(s)}$$

where $Z(s)$ is a PRF, $k$ is a positive real constant, and $s= \sigma + i \omega$ is the complex frequency variable, can be written as,

$$R(s) = \dfrac{1-W(s)}{1+W(s)}$$

where,

$$W(s) = {1 - \dfrac{Z(s)}{Z(k)} \over 1 + \dfrac{Z(s)}{Z(k)}} \left( \frac{k+s}{k-s} \right)$$

Since $Z(s)$ is PRF then

$$1 +  \dfrac{Z(s)}{Z(k)}$$

is also PRF. The zeroes of this function are the poles of $W(s)$. Since a PRF can have no zeroes in the right-half s-plane, then $W(s)$ can have no poles in the right-half s-plane and hence is analytic in the right-half s-plane.

Let

$$Z(i \omega) = r (\omega) + ix(\omega)$$

Then the magnitude of $W(i \omega)$ is given by,

$$\left| W(i \omega) \right| = \sqrt{ \dfrac{ (Z(k) - r(\omega))^2 +x(\omega)^2 }{ (Z(k) + r(\omega))^2 +x(\omega)^2 }}$$

Since the PRF condition requires that $r(\omega) \ge 0$ for all $\omega$ then $\left| W(i \omega) \right| \le 1$ for all $\omega$. The maximum magnitude of $W(s)$ occurs on the $i \omega$ axis because $W(s)$ is analytic in the right-half s-plane. Thus $|W(s)| \le 1$ for $\sigma \ge 0$.

Let $W(s) = u( \sigma, \omega) + iv( \sigma, \omega)$, then the real part of $R(s)$ is given by,

$$\Re (R(s)) = \dfrac{1 - |W(s)|^2}{ (1 + u( \sigma, \omega))^2 + v^2(\sigma, \omega)}$$

Because $W(s) \le 1$ for $\sigma \ge 0$ then $\Re (R(s)) \ge 0$ for $\sigma \ge 0$ and consequently $R(s)$ must be a PRF.

Richards' theorem can also be derived from Schwarz's lemma.

== Uses ==
The theorem was introduced by Paul I. Richards as part of his investigation into the properties of PRFs. The term PRF was coined by Otto Brune who proved that the PRF property was a necessary and sufficient condition for a function to be realisable as a passive electrical network, an important result in network synthesis. Richards gave the theorem in his 1947 paper in the reduced form,

$$R(s) = \frac{Z(s)-sZ(1)}{Z(1)-sZ(s)}$$

that is, the special case where $k=1$

The theorem (with the more general casse of $k$ being able to take on any value) formed the basis of the network synthesis technique presented by Raoul Bott and Richard Duffin in 1949. In the Bott-Duffin synthesis, $Z(s)$ represents the electrical network to be synthesised and $R(s)$ is another (unknown) network incorporated within it ($R(s)$ is unitless, but $R(s)Z(k)$ has units of impedance and $R(s)/Z(k)$ has units of admittance). Making $Z(s)$ the subject gives

$$Z(s) = \left( \frac{R(s)}{Z(k)} + \frac{k}{sZ(k)} \right)^{-1} +  \left(\frac{1}{Z(k) R(s)} + \frac{s}{k Z(k)} \right)^{-1}$$

Since $Z(k)$ is merely a positive real number, $Z(s)$ can be synthesised as a new network proportional to $R(s)$ in parallel with a capacitor all in series with a network proportional to the inverse of $R(s)$ in parallel with an inductor. By a suitable choice for the value of $k$, a resonant circuit can be extracted from $R(s)$ leaving a function $Z'(s)$ two degrees lower than $Z(s)$. The whole process can then be applied iteratively to $Z'(s)$ until the degree of the function is reduced to something that can be realised directly.

The advantage of the Bott-Duffin synthesis is that, unlike other methods, it is able to synthesise any PRF. Other methods have limitations such as only being able to deal with two kinds of element in any single network. Its major disadvantage is that it does not result in the minimal number of elements in a network. The number of elements grows exponentially with each iteration. After the first iteration there are two $Z'$ and associated elements, after the second, there are four $Z''$ and so on.

Hubbard notes that Bott and Duffin appeared not to know the relationship of Richards' theorem to Schwarz's lemma and offers it as his own discovery, but it was certainly known to Richards who used it in his own proof of the theorem.

== Bibliography ==
- Bott, Raoul; Duffin, Richard, "Impedance synthesis without use of transformers", Journal of Applied Physics, vol. 20, iss. 8, p. 816, August 1949.
- Cauer, Emil; Mathis, Wolfgang; Pauli, Rainer, "Life and Work of Wilhelm Cauer (1900 – 1945)", Proceedings of the Fourteenth International Symposium of Mathematical Theory of Networks and Systems (MTNS2000), Perpignan, June, 2000.
- Hubbard, John H., "The Bott-Duffin synthesis of electrical circuits", pp. 33–40 in, Kotiuga, P. Robert (ed), A Celebration of the Mathematical Legacy of Raoul Bott, American Mathematical Society, 2010 ISBN 9780821883815.
- Hughes, Timothy H.; Morelli, Alessandro; Smith, Malcolm C., "Electrical network synthesis: A survey of recent work", pp. 281–293 in, Tempo, R.; Yurkovich, S.; Misra, P. (eds), Emerging Applications of Control and Systems Theory, Springer, 2018 ISBN 9783319670676.
- Richards, Paul I., "A special class of functions with positive real part in a half-plane", Duke Mathematical Journal, vol. 14, no. 3, 777–786, 1947.
- Wing, Omar, Classical Circuit Theory, Springer, 2008 ISBN 0387097406.
