= Antimetric =

Antimetric may refer to:

- Antimetric (electrical networks) of a network that exhibits anti-symmetrical electrical properties
- Antimetric matrix, a matrix equal to its negative transpose
- Antimetrication, a position opposed to the use of the metric system of measurements
