= Wilhelm Cauer =

German mathematician and scientist (1900–1945)

- Born: 24 June 1900; Berlin, German Empire
- Died: 22 April 1945 (aged 44); Berlin-Marienfelde, Germany
- Education: Technische Universität Berlin
- Scientific career
- Fields: Mathematics
- Doctoral advisor: Georg Hamel
- Doctoral students: Vitold Belevitch

Wilhelm Cauer (24 June 1900 – 22 April 1945) was a German mathematician and scientist. He is most noted for his work on the analysis and synthesis of electrical filters and his work marked the beginning of the field of network synthesis. Prior to his work, electronic filter design used techniques which accurately predicted filter behaviour only under unrealistic conditions. This required a certain amount of experience on the part of the designer to choose suitable sections to include in the design. Cauer placed the field on a firm mathematical footing, providing tools that could produce exact solutions to a given specification for the design of an electronic filter.

Cauer initially specialised in general relativity but soon switched to electrical engineering. His work for a German subsidiary of the Bell Telephone Company brought him into contact with leading American engineers in the field of filters. This proved useful when Cauer was unable to feed his children during the German economic crisis of the 1920s and he moved to the US. He studied early computer techniques in the US prior to returning to Germany. According to Wilhelm Cauer's son Emil the rise of Nazism in Germany stifled Cauer's career because he had a remote Jewish ancestor. Cauer was murdered during the fall of Berlin by Soviet soldiers.

The manuscripts for some of Cauer's most important unpublished works were destroyed during the war. However, his family succeeded in reconstructing much of this from his notes and volume II of Theorie der linearen Wechselstromschaltungen was published after his death. Cauer's legacy continues today, with network synthesis being the method of choice for network design.

== Life and career ==
=== Early life and family ===
Wilhelm Adolf Eduard Cauer was born in Berlin, Germany, on 24 June 1900. He came from a long line of academics. His early grammar school (gymnasium) was the Kaiserin Augusta Gymnasium, an institution founded by his great-grandfather, Ludwig Cauer. This school was located on Cauerstrasse, named after Ludwig, in the Charlottenburg district of Berlin. The building still exists, but is now a primary school, the Ludwig Cauer Grundschule. He later attended the Mommsen Gymnasium, Berlin. His father, also Wilhelm Cauer, was a Privy Councillor and a professor of railway engineering at the Technische Hochschule in Charlottenburg (now Technische Universität Berlin). Cauer became interested in mathematics at the age of thirteen and continued to demonstrate that he was academically inclined as he grew.

Briefly, Cauer served in the German army in the final stages of World War I. He married Karoline Cauer (a relation) in 1925 and eventually fathered six children.

=== Career ===
Cauer started off in a field completely unrelated to filters; from 1922 he worked with Max von Laue on general relativity, and his first publication (1923) was in this field. For reasons that are not clear, he changed his field after this to electrical engineering. He graduated in applied physics in 1924 from the Technische Hochschule in Charlottenburg (now Technische Universität Berlin).

He then spent a period working for Mix & Genest, a branch of the Bell Telephone Company, applying probability theory to telephone switching. He also worked on timer relays. He had two telecommunications-related publications during this period on "Telephone switching systems" and "Losses of real inductors".

The relationship of Mix & Genest with Bell gave Cauer an easy path to collaboration with AT&T's engineers at Bell Labs in the US which must have been of enormous help when Cauer embarked on a study of filter design. Bell were at the forefront of filter design at this time with the likes of George Campbell in Boston and Otto Zobel in New York making major contributions. However, it was with Ronald M. Foster that Cauer had much correspondence and it was his work that Cauer recognised as being of such importance. His paper, A reactance theorem, is a milestone in filter theory and inspired Cauer to generalise this approach into what has now become the field of network synthesis.

In June 1926 Cauer presented his thesis paper, The realisation of impedances of specified frequency dependence^{[a]}, at the Institute of Applied Mathematics and Mechanics of the Technische Hochschule Charlottenburg. This paper is the beginning of modern network synthesis.

In 1927 Cauer went to work as a research assistant at Richard Courant's Institute of Mathematics at the University of Göttingen. In 1928 he obtained his habilitation and became an external university lecturer.

Cauer found that he could not support his family during the economic crisis of the 1920s and in 1930 took his family to the USA where he had obtained a scholarship (a Rockefeller fellowship) to study at MIT and Harvard University. He worked with Vannevar Bush who was building machines for the solution of mathematical problems. Essentially, these were what we would now call analogue computers: Cauer was interested in using them to solve linear systems to aid in filter designs. His work on Filter circuits^{[b]} was completed in 1931 while still in the US.

Cauer met, and had strong contacts with, many of the key researchers in the field of filter design at Bell Labs. These included Hendrik Bode, George Campbell, Sidney Darlington, Foster and Otto Zobel.

For a short while, Cauer worked for the Wired Radio Company in Newark, New Jersey but then returned to Göttingen with the intention of building a fast analogue computer there. However, he was unable to obtain funding due to the depression.

Cauer seems to have got on very poorly with his German colleagues. According to Rainer Pauli, his correspondence with them was usually brief and business-like, rarely, if ever, discussing issues in depth. By contrast, his correspondence with his American and European acquaintances was warm, technically deep and often included personal family news and greetings. This correspondence went beyond his American contacts and included A.C. Bartlett of the General Electric Company in Wembley, Roger Julia of Lignes Télégraphiques et Téléphoniques in Paris, mathematicians Gustav Herglotz, Georg Pick and Hungarian graph theorist Dénes Kőnig.

After leaving the Technical Institute for Mix & Genest, Cauer sought to become active in the Verband Deutscher Elektrotechniker (VDE, the German Electrical Engineers Society). He left the VDE, however, in 1942 after a serious falling out with Wagner, previously his PhD supervisor and ally.

=== Nazi era ===
In November 1933 Cauer signed the Vow of allegiance of the Professors of the German Universities and High-Schools to Adolf Hitler and the National Socialistic State.

The rising force of Nazism became a major obstacle to Cauer's work from 1933 onwards. The anti-Jewish hysteria of the time forced many academics to leave their posts, including the director of the Mathematics Institute, Richard Courant. Although Cauer was not Jewish, it became known that he had a Jewish ancestor, Daniel Itzig, who had been a banker to Frederick II of Prussia. While this revelation was not sufficient to have Cauer removed under the race laws, it stifled his future career. Thus he gained the title of professor but was never given a chair.

By 1935 Cauer had three children whom he was finding increasingly difficult to support, which prompted him to return to industry. In 1936 he temporarily worked for the aircraft manufacturer Fieseler at their Fi 156 Storch works in Kassel and then became director of the laboratory of Mix & Genest in Berlin. Nevertheless, he did continue to lecture at the Technische Hochschule Berlin from 1939.

In 1941, the first volume of his main work, Theory of Linear AC Circuits was published.^{[e]} The original manuscript to the second volume was destroyed as a result of the war. Although Cauer was able to reproduce this work, he was not able to publish it and it too was lost during the war. Some time after his death, however, his family arranged for the publication of some of his papers as the second volume,^{[f]} based on surviving descriptions of the intended contents of volume II.

After taking his children to stay with relatives in Witzenhausen (in Hesse) to protect them from the expected fall of Berlin to the Russians, Cauer, against advice, returned to Berlin. His body was located after the end of the war in a mass grave of victims of Russian executions. Cauer had been shot dead in Berlin-Marienfelde by Soviet soldiers as a hostage. Soviet intelligence was actively looking for scientists they could use in their own researches and Cauer was on their list of people to find but it would seem that this was unknown to his executioners.

== Network synthesis ==
The major part of Cauer's legacy is his contribution to the network synthesis of passive networks. He is considered the founder of the field and the publication of his principal work in English was enthusiastically greeted, even though this did not happen until seventeen years later (in 1958). Prior to network synthesis, networks, especially filters, were designed using the image impedance method. The accuracy of predictions of response from such designs depended on accurate impedance matching between sections. This could be achieved with sections entirely internal to the filter but it was not possible to perfectly match to the end terminations. For this reason, image filter designers incorporated end sections in their designs of a different form optimised for an improved match rather than filtering response. The choice of form of such sections was more a matter of designer experience than design calculation. Network synthesis entirely did away with the need for this. It directly predicted the response of the filter and included the terminations in the synthesis.

Cauer treated network synthesis as being the inverse problem of network analysis. Whereas network analysis asks what is the response of a given network, network synthesis on the other hand asks what are the networks that can produce a given desired response. Cauer solved this problem by comparing electrical quantities and functions to their mechanical equivalents. Then, realising that they were completely analogous, applying the known Lagrangian mechanics to the problem.

According to Cauer, there are three major tasks that network synthesis has to address. The first is the ability to determine whether a given transfer function is realisable as an impedance network. The second is to find the canonical (minimal) forms of these functions and the relationships (transforms) between different forms representing the same transfer function. Finally, it is not, in general, possible to find an exact finite-element solution to an ideal transfer function - such as zero attenuation at all frequencies below a given cutoff frequency and infinite attenuation above. The third task is therefore to find approximation techniques for achieving the desired responses.

Initially, the work revolved around one-port impedances. The transfer function between a voltage and a current amounting to the expression for the impedance itself. A useful network can be produced by breaking open a branch of the network and calling that the output.

=== Realisability ===
- Following on from Foster, Cauer generalised the relationship between the expression for the impedance of a one-port network and its transfer function.
- He discovered the necessary and sufficient condition for realisability of a one-port impedance. That is, those impedance expressions that could actually be built as a real circuit. In later papers he made generalisations to multiport networks.

=== Transformation ===
- Cauer discovered that all solutions for the realisation of a given impedance expression could be obtained from one given solution by a group of affine transformations.
- He generalised Foster's ladder realisation to filters which included resistors (Foster's were reactance only) and discovered an isomorphism between all two-element kind networks.
- He identified the canonical forms of filter realisation. That is, the minimal forms, which includes the ladder networks obtained by Stieltjes's continued fraction expansion.

=== Approximation ===
- He used the Chebyshev approximation to design filters. Cauer's application of Tchebyscheff polynomials resulted in the filters now known as elliptic filters, or sometimes Cauer filters, which have optimally fast passband to stopband transitions for a given maximum attenuation variation. The well known Chebyshev filters can be viewed as a special case of elliptic filters and can be arrived at using the same approximation techniques. So can the Butterworth (maximally flat) filter, although this was an independent discovery by Stephen Butterworth arrived at by a different method.

Cauer's work was initially ignored because his canonical forms made use of ideal transformers. This made his circuits of less practical use to engineers. However, it was soon realised that Cauer's Tchebyscheff approximation could just as easily be applied to the rather more useful ladder topology and ideal transformers could be dispensed with. From then on network synthesis began to supplant image design as the method of choice.

=== Further work ===
Most of the above work is contained in Cauer's first^{[b]} and second^{[e]} monographs and is largely a treatment of one-ports. In his habilitation thesis^{[c]} Cauer begins to extend this work by showing that a global canonical form cannot be found in the general case for three-element kind multiports (that is, networks containing all three R, L and C elements) for the generation of realisation solutions, as it can be for the two-element kind case.

Cauer extended the work of Bartlett and Brune on geometrically symmetric 2-ports to all symmetric 2-ports, that is 2-ports which are electrically symmetrical but not necessarily topologically symmetrical, finding a number of canonical circuits. He also studied antimetric 2-ports. He also extended Foster's theorem to 2-element LC n-ports (1931) and showed that all equivalent LC networks could be derived from each other^{[d]} by linear transformations.

== Publications ==
- [a] Cauer, W, "Die Verwirklichung der Wechselstromwiderstände vorgeschriebener Frequenzabhängigkeit", Archiv für Elektrotechnik, vol 17, pp355–388, 1926. The realisation of impedances of prescribed frequency dependence (in German)
- Cauer, W, "Über die Variablen eines passiven Vierpols", Sitzungsberichte d. Preuß. Akademie d.Wissenschaften, phys-math Klasse, pp268–274, 1927. On the variables of some passive quadripoles (in German)
- Cauer, W, "Über eine Klasse von Funktionen, die die Stieljesschen Kettenbrüche als Sonderfall enthält", Jahresberichte der Dt. Mathematikervereinigung (DMV), vol 38, pp63–72, 1929. On a class of functions represented by truncated Stieltjes continued fractions (in German)
- Cauer, W, "Vierpole", Elektrische Nachrichtentechnik (ENT), vol 6, pp272–282, 1929. Quadripoles (in German)
- Cauer, W, "Die Siebschaltungen der Fernmeldetechnik", Journal of Applied Mathematics and Mechanics, vol 10, pp425–433, 1930. Telephony filter circuits (in German)
- Cauer, W, "Ein Reaktanztheorem", Sitzungsberichte d. Preuß. Akademie d. Wissenschaften, phys-math. Klasse, pp673–681, 1931. A reactance theorem (in German)
- [b] *Cauer, W, Siebschaltungen, VDI-Verlag, Berlin, 1931. Filter circuits (in German)
- [c] *Cauer, W, "Untersuchungen über ein Problem, das drei positiv definite quadratische Formen mit Streckenkomplexen in Beziehung setzt", Mathematische Annalen, vol 105, pp86–132, 1931. On a problem where three positive definite quadratic forms are related to one-dimensional complexes (in German)
- Cauer, W, "Ideale Transformatoren und lineare Transformationen", Elektrische Nachrichtentechnik (ENT), vol 9, pp157–174, 1932. Ideal transformers and linear transformations (in German)
- Cauer, W, "The Poisson integral for functions with positive real part", Bull. Amer. Math. Soc., vol 38, pp713–717, 1932.
- Cauer, W, "Über Funktionen mit positivem Realteil", Mathematische Annalen, vol 106, pp369–394, 1932. On positive-real functions (in German)
- Cauer, W, "Ein Interpolationsproblem mit Funktionen mit positivem Realteil", Mathematische Zeitschrift, vol 38, pp1–44, 1933. An interpolation problem of positive-real functions (in German)
- [d] Cauer, W, "Äquivalenz von 2n-Polen ohne Ohmsche Widerstände", Nachrichten d. Gesellschaft d. Wissenschaften Göttingen, math-phys. Kl., vol 1, N.F., pp1–33, 1934. Equivalence of 2-poles without resistors (in German)
- Cauer, W, "Vierpole mit vorgeschriebenem Dämpfungsverhalten", Telegraphen-, Fernsprech-, Funk- und Fernsehtechnik, vol 29, pp185–192, 228–235, 1940. Quadripoles with prescribed insertion loss (in German)
- [e] Cauer, W, Theorie der linearen Wechselstromschaltungen, Vol.I, Akad. Verlags-Gesellschaft Becker und Erler, Leipzig, 1941. Theory of Linear AC Circuits, Vol I (in German)
- Cauer, W, Synthesis of Linear Communication Networks, McGraw-Hill, New York, 1958. (published posthumously)
- [f] Cauer, W, Theorie der linearen Wechselstromschaltungen, Vol. II, Akademie-Verlag, Berlin, 1960. Theory of Linear AC Circuits, Vol II (published posthumously in German)
- [g] Brune, O, "Synthesis of a finite two-terminal network whose driving-point impedance is a prescribed function of frequency", J. Math. and Phys., vol 10, pp191–236, 1931.

== See also ==
- Black box
- Cauer topology
- Tchebyscheff filter

== Bibliography ==
=== Referenced works ===
- E. Cauer, W. Mathis, and R. Pauli, "Life and Work of Wilhelm Cauer (1900 – 1945)", Proceedings of the Fourteenth International Symposium of Mathematical Theory of Networks and Systems (MTNS2000), Perpignan, June 2000. Retrieved online 19 September 2008.
- Belevitch, V, "Summary of the History of Circuit Theory", Proceedings of the IRE, vol 50, pp848–855, May 1962.
- Bray, J, Innovation and the Communications Revolution, Institute of Electrical Engineers, 2002 ISBN 0852962185.
- Matthaei, Young, Jones Microwave Filters, Impedance-Matching Networks, and Coupling Structures McGraw-Hill 1964.

=== Further reading ===
- Guillemin, E A, "A recent contribution to the design of electrical filter networks". Journ. Math. Phys., vol 11, pp150–211, 1931–32. A comparison of the methods of Cauer and Zobel
- Julia, R, "Sur la Theorie des Filtres de W. Cauer", Bull. Soc. Franc. Electr., October 1935. Recommended by R. Pauli as the most profound treatise on Cauer's theory (in French).
- Wilhelm Cauer: His Life and the Reception of his Work Mathis, W and Cauer, E, University of Hannover, 2002. A PowerPoint presentation.
