= Lars Wanhammar =

Swedish electrical engineer

- Born: 19 August 1944 (age 82); Vansbro, Sweden
- Education: Linköping University
- Known for: Analog and digital filters
- Scientific career
- Fields: Digital signal processing (DSP)
- Workplaces: Linköping University
- Thesis: An Approach to LSI implementation of wave digital filters (1981)

Lars Wanhammar (born 19 August 1944) is a Swedish electrical engineer who is professor emeritus at Linköping University. He has been a pioneer in Swedish digital signal processing (DSP) since 1981.

== Education ==
Wanhammar studied at Linköping University, where he graduated with a master's degree in 1970, as an engineer in 1980 and a doctorate in 1981.

=== Thesis publications ===
- An Approach to LSI implementation of wave digital filters, dissertation, 200 pages, 1981. OCLC 256049497.

== Selected works ==
- Wanhammar, Lars & Saramäki, Tapio: Digital Filters Using MATLAB. Springer, 2020. ISBN 978-3-030-24062-2, ISBN 978-3-030-24063-9 (eBook).
- Wanhammar, Lars: Analog Filters using MATLAB. Springer, 2009. ISBN 978-0-387-92766-4.
- Wanhammar, Lars: DSP Integrated Circuits. Academic Press, 1999. ISBN 0-12-734530-2.
