= Paul I. Richards =

American physicist and mathematician (1923–1978)

Paul Irving Richards (1923–1978) was a physicist and applied mathematician. Richard's is best known to electrical engineers for the eponymous Richards' transformation. However, much of his career was concerned with radiation transport and fluid flow. Notably, he produced one of the earliest models of traffic waves on busy highways.

== Early life and education ==
Richards was born in Orono, Maine in 1923. In 1943 he dropped out of his undergraduate course at Harvard after the first year to work at the Radio Research Laboratory (RRL) set up on the campus at Harvard during World War II to research electronic countermeasures. At the end of the war, Richards was accepted back into Harvard as a Ph.D. student without first completing his bachelor's degree. He received his Ph.D. in physics in 1947 with a dissertation on commensurate line theory that marked the beginning of this field.

== Career ==
At RRL Richards worked on microwave filters, an important component of radar and countermeasures against it. This work formed the background for his commensurate line theory, although that theory was apparently not well developed enough at the time to be put to use in wartime work. The culmination of this theory was in his 1948 paper "Resistor-transmission-line circuits", after which Richards left the field of microwave engineering. The theory formed the basis of most transmission-line type microwave filters for at least the next thirty-five years and the design technique is still in use today. Richards' transformation, introduced in this work, is still found in modern textbooks on radio frequency filter design. During this period Richards also discovered a theorem in complex analysis now known as Richards' theorem which has applications in network synthesis.

Between 1947 and 1952 he was a physicist at the Brookhaven National Laboratory helping to develop the magnetic time-of-flight mass spectrometer with Earl E. Hays and Samuel Goudsmit. From 1952 to 1954 he was director of research at Transistor Products Inc. From 1954 to 1968 he was senior physicist with Technical Operations Inc. In 1956, while at Technical Operations, Richards produced a paper "Shock waves on the highway", one of the earliest theoretical models of traffic waves (there was another paper on this the previous year by Lighthill and Whitham in the UK, but Richards was apparently not aware of it and his work is independent). The traffic flow model described in this paper is now known as the Lighthill-Whitham-Richards model.

From 1968 until his death on 19 November 1978 he was a senior scientist with Arcon Corporation. At Arcon he was primarily concerned with radiation transport, particularly neutrons.

== Editorships ==
Richards was on the publications committee of the Society for Industrial and Applied Mathematics and was an editor of SIAM Review. Richards was interested in promoting clarity in scientific writing. He wrote a book and several articles on the subject.

== Selected works ==
=== Books ===
- Manual of Mathematical Physics, Pergamon Press, 1959 OCLC 932132.
- (with Irving T. Richards) Proper Words in Proper Places, Christopher Publishing House, 1964 OCLC 1368687—A guide to technical writing.

=== Articles ===
- "Applications of matrix algebra to filter theory", Proceedings of the IRE, vol. 34, iss. 3, pp. 145–150, March 1946.
- "Universal optimum-response curves for arbitrarily coupled resonators", Proceedings of the IRE, vol. 34, iss. 9, pp. 624–629, September, 1946.
- General impedance-function theory and transmission-networks, Ph.D. thesis, Harvard, 1947.
- "A special class of functions with positive real part in a half-plane", Duke Mathematical Journal, vol. 14, no. 3, 777–786, 1947.
- "General impedance-function theory", Quarterly of Applied Mathematics, vol. 6, pp. 21–29, 1948.
- "Resistor-transmission-line circuits", Proceedings of the IRE, vol. 36, iss. 2, pp. 217–220, 1948.
- "On the Hamiltonian for a particle in an electromagnetic field", Physical Review, vol. 73, iss. 3, p. 254, February 1948.
- "Probability of coincidence for two periodically recurring events", The Annals of Mathematical Statistics, vol. 19, no. 1, pp. 16–29, March 1948.
- (with Hartland S. Snyder) "Collision and saturation broadening in microwave spectra", Physical Review, vol. 73, iss. 10, pp. 1178–1180, May 1948.
- "Notes on Feenberg's series-rearrangements", Physical Review, vol. 74, iss. 7, pp. 835–836, October 1948.
- (with E. E. Hays and S. A. Goudsmit) "Magnetic time-of-flight mass spectrometer", Physical Review, vol. 76, p. 180, 1949.
- (with B. A. Rubins) "Irradiation of small volumes by contained radioisotopes", Nucleonics, vol. 6, iss. 6, pp. 42–49, June 1950."Machines which can learn", American Scientist, vol. 39, no. 4, pp. 711–716, October 1951.
- (with E. E. Hays and S. A. Goudsmit) "Mass measurement with a magnetic time-of-flight mass spectrometer", Physical Review, vol. 84, iss. 4, pp. 824–829, November 1951
- "Multiple isotropic scattering", Physical Review, vol. 100, iss. 2, pp. 517–522, October 1955.
- (with S. S. Holland Jr.) "Neutron flux spectra in air", Journal of Applied Physics, vol. 27, iss. 9, pp. 1024–1050, 1956.
- "Scattering from a point source in plane clouds", Journal of the Optical Society of America, vol. 46, iss. 11, pp. 927–934, 1956.
- "Shock waves on the highway", Operations Research, vol. 4, iss. 1, pp. 42–51, 1 February 1956.
- "Transients in conducting media", IRE Transactions on Antennas and Propagation, vol. 6, iss. 2, pp. 178–182, April 1958.
- "Radiative transport from point sources in a stratified medium", Journal of the Optical Society of America, vol. 49, iss. 3, pp. 245–249, 1959.
- "The order of electron shells in ionized atoms", Proceedings of the National Academy of Sciences of the United States of America, vol. 51, iss. 4, pp. 664–671, April 1964.
- "Averages for polygons formed by random lines", Proceedings of the National Academy of Sciences of the United States of America, vol. 52, no. 5, pp. 1160–1164, November 1964.
- (with W. D. Lanning and M. D. Torrey) "Numerical integration of large, highly-damped, nonlinear systems", SIAM Review, vol. 7, iss. 3, pp. 376–380, July 1965.
- "Synthesizing transfer functions with two grounded pentodes", Proceedings of the IEEE, vol. 55, iss. 4, pp. 552–553, April 1967.

== Bibliography ==
- Kerner, Boris S., The Physics of Traffic, Springer, 2012 ISBN 3540409866.
- Levy, Ralph; Cohn, Seymour B., "A history of microwave filter research, design, and development", IEEE Transactions on Microwave Theory and Techniques, vol. 32, iss. 9, pp. 1055–1067, September 1984.
- Lighthill, M. J.; Whitham, G. B., "On kinematic waves: II. A theory of traffic flow on long crowded roads", The Royal Society: Proceedings A, vol. 229, iss. 1178, pp. 317–345, May 1955.
- Needell, Allan A., Science, Cold War and the American State, Routledge, 2013 ISBN 1135852790.
- Wen, Geyi, Foundations for Radio Frequency Engineering, World Scientific, 2015 ISBN 981457872X.
- Woolf, Stanley, "Obituaries: Paul I. Richards", Physics Today, vol. 32, iss. 5, pp. 86–87, May 1979.
