= Tapio Saramäki =

Finnish electrical engineer

Tapio Antero Saramäki (12 June 1953) is a Finnish electrical engineer and professor emeritus. He is a pioneer in Finnish digital signal processing (DSP) since 1981. His diploma engineer thesis (1978) and doctor of technology thesis (1981) were the first digital signal processing theses in Tampere University of Technology.

== Awards and honors ==
- Circuits and Systems Society's Guillemin-Cauer Award (1988)
- IEEE Fellow (2002) for contributions to the design and implementation of digital filters and filter banks
- The Journal of Circuits, Systems, and Computers Best Paper Award (2003)
- Circuits and Systems Society's Guillemin-Cauer Award (2006)
