= Albert Charles Bartlett =

British electrical engineer (1892–1939)

Albert Charles Bartlett (5 August 1892 – ) was a British electrical engineer who worked for the General Electric Company in Wembley. He had some correspondence with Wilhelm Cauer on the subject of filter designs.

He published a treatment of geometrically symmetrical 2-port networks in 1927 and is responsible for Bartlett's bisection theorem which shows that any symmetrical network can be transformed into a symmetrical lattice network.

He also patented the idea of using the method of an active amplifier with "negative resistance" to cancel the inductance of a telephone line.

== Publications ==
=== Journal articles ===
- Bartlett, AC, "An extension of a property of artificial lines", Phil. Mag., vol 4, p902, November 1927.
- Bartlett, AC, "A standard of small capacity differences", J. Sci. Instrum., vol 8, No 8 (August 1931), pp260–262.
- Bartlett, AC, "Note on the theory of screened impedances in A.C. bridges with the Wagner earth",J. Sci. Instrum., vol 6, No 9 (September 1929), pp277–280.
- Bartlett, AC, "A small peak voltmeter and an application", J. Sci. Instrum., vol 8, No 9 (June 1924), pp281–284.

=== Patents ===
- Bartlett, AC, Line balance for loaded telephone circuits, GB1767199, filed 30 Mar 1925, issued 24 Jun 1930.
- Bartlett, AC, Improvements in Electric Discharge Tubes, GB239736, filed 30 Oct 1924, issued 17 Sept 1925.
- Bartlett, AC, An improved method for reducing the self-inductance of electric circuits, GB278036, filed 25 May 1926, issued 26 Sep 1927.

=== Books ===
- Bartlett, AC, The theory of electrical artificial lines and filters, 1930, Chapman & Hall (London), LCCN 30030668.
