= Otto Brune =

(1901 – 1982) South African mathematician

Otto Walter Heinrich Oscar Brune
- Born: 10 January 1901; Bloemfontein, Orange Free State
- Died: 1982 (aged 80–81)
- Education: Massachusetts Institute of Technology
- Known for: Network synthesis Brune test
- Scientific career
- Workplaces: National Research Laboratories, Pretoria
- Thesis: Synthesis of a finite two-terminal network whose driving-point impedance is a prescribed function of frequency (1931)
- Doctoral advisors: Wilhelm Cauer; Ernst Guillemin

Otto Walter Heinrich Oscar Brune (10 January 1901 – 1982) undertook some key investigations into network synthesis at the Massachusetts Institute of Technology (MIT) where he graduated in 1929. His doctoral thesis was supervised by Wilhelm Cauer and Ernst Guillemin, who the latter ascribed to Brune the laying of "the mathematical foundation for modern realization theory".

== Biography ==
Brune was born in Bloemfontein, Orange Free State 10 January 1901 and grew up in Kimberley, Cape Colony. He enrolled in the University of Stellenbosch in 1918, receiving a Bachelor of Science in 1920 and Master of Science in 1921. He taught German, mathematics, and science at the Potchefstroom Gymnasium, Transvaal in 1922, and lectured in mathematics at the Transvaal University College, Pretoria 1923–1925.

In 1926 Brune moved to the US to attend the Massachusetts Institute of Technology (MIT) under the sponsorship of the General Electric Company, receiving bachelor's and master's degrees in 1929. From 1929 to 1930, Brune was involved in artificial lightning tests on the power transmission line from Croton Dam, Michigan as a research assistant at MIT. From 1930, Brune was a Fellow in Electrical Engineering at MIT with an Austin Research Fellowship.

Brune returned to South Africa in 1935. He became Principal Research Officer at the National Research Laboratories, Pretoria.

Brune had a daughter, Jennifer Brune, born in the 1930s. She later married into the Grosskopf family and became known as Jennifer Grosskopf. Through his daughter, Brune’s family lineage continued in South Africa.

== Works ==
In 1933, Brune was working on his doctoral thesis entitled, Synthesis of Passive Networks and Cauer suggested that he provide a proof of the necessary and sufficient conditions for the realisability of multi-port impedances. Cauer himself had found a necessary condition but had failed to prove it to be sufficient. The goal for researchers then was "to remove the restrictions implicit in the Foster-Cauer realisations and find conditions on Z equivalent to realisability by a network composed of arbitrary interconnections of positive-valued R, C and L."

Brune coined the term positive-real (PR) for that class of analytic functions that are realisable as an electrical network using passive components. He did not only introduce the mathematical characterization of this function in one complex variable but also demonstrated "the necessity and sufficiency for the realization of driving point functions of lumped, linear, finite, passive, time-invariant and bilateral network. Brune also showed that if the case is limited to scalar PR functions then there was no other theoretical reason that required ideal transformers in the realisation (transformers limit the practical usefulness of the theory), but was unable to show (as others later did) that transformers can always be avoided. The eponymous Brune cycle continued fractions were invented by Brune to facilitate this proof.

The Brune theorem is:

1. The impedance Z(s) of any electric network composed of passive components is positive-real.
2. If Z(s) is positive-real it is realisable by a network having as components passive (positive) R, C, L, and ideal transformers T.

Brune is also responsible for the Brune test for determining the permissibility of interconnecting two-port networks.

== Legacy ==
For his work, Brune is recognized as one of those who laid the foundation of network analysis by means of mathematics. For instance, American computer scientist Ernst Guillemin dedicated his book Synthesis of Passive Network to Brune, describing him with these words: "In my opinion the one primarily responsible for establishing a very broad and mathematically rigorous basis for realization theory generally was Otto Brune."

== Bibliography ==
- Cauer, E.; Mathis, W.; Pauli, R., "Life and Work of Wilhelm Cauer (1900–1945)", Proceedings of the Fourteenth International Symposium of Mathematical Theory of Networks and Systems (MTNS2000), Perpignan, June 2000.
- Chen, Wai-Kai, Active Filters: Theory and Implementation, Wiley, 1986 ISBN 047182352X.
- Brune, O., "Synthesis of a finite two-terminal network whose driving-point impedance is a prescribed function of frequency", Doctoral thesis, 5 May 1931a, republished in, MIT Journal of Mathematics and Physics, vol. 10, pp. 191–236, 1931b.
- Brune O., "Equivalent Electrical Networks", Physical Review, vol. 38, pp. 1783–1783, 1931c.
- Galkowski, Krzysztof; Wood, Jeff David, Multidimensional Signals, Circuits and Systems, Taylor & Francis, 2001 ISBN 0415253632.
- Horrocks, D. H.; Nightingale, C., "The compatibility of n-ports in parallel", International Journal of Circuit Theory and Applications, vol. 4, pp. 81–85, January 1976.
- Seising, Rudolf, Die Fuzzifizierung der Systeme, Franz Steiner Verlag, 2005 ISBN 3515087680
- Seising, Rudolf, The Fuzzification of Systems: The Genesis of Fuzzy Set Theory and its Initial Applications – Developments up to the 1970s Springer, 2007 ISBN 9783540717942.
- Wildes, Karl L.; Lindgren, Nilo A., A century of electrical engineering and computer science at MIT, 1882-1982, MIT Press, 1985 ISBN 0-262-23119-0.
- Willems, Jan; Hara, Shinji; Ohta, Yoshito; Fujioka, Hisaya, Perspectives in Mathematical System Theory, Control, and Signal Processing, Springer, 2010 ISBN 9783540939177.
