= Malcolm C. Smith =

British electrical engineer

Professor Malcolm C. Smith FREng
- Education: University of Cambridge
- Known for: contributions to feedback control and systems theory
- Awards: FREng; FIEEE
- Scientific career
- Fields: control engineering
- Workplaces: University of Cambridge; Ohio State University
- Thesis: A Generalised Nyquist/Root-Locus Theory for Multi-Loop Feedback Systems (1982)
- Website: www.eng.cam.ac.uk/profiles/mcs1000

Malcolm Clive Smith is a British electrical engineer. He is a professor of control engineering at the University of Cambridge. He is notable for his contributions to feedback control and systems theory. He is also the inventor of the inerter, used in mechanical network synthesis.

== Career ==
Smith studied at the University of Cambridge (BA 1978, MPhil 1979, PhD 1982); his doctoral thesis was entitled "A Generalised Nyquist/Root-Locus Theory for Multi-Loop Feedback Systems". He worked in various research and academic posts, becoming an assistant professor at Ohio State University. In 1990, he moved to the University of Cambridge where he became a professor of control engineering and a fellow of Gonville and Caius College.

Smith's research has dealt with both theoretical contributions to control and practical applications, particularly in the automotive and motorsport domains. A notable contribution was the development of the inerter,' which removed some of the previous limitations on passive network synthesis. When awarding him a fellowship, the IEEE cited Smith's 'contributions to feedback control and systems theory'.

As of early 2014, Smith is head of the Control Group within the University of Cambridge's Department of Engineering.

== Awards ==
Smith has received the following notable awards:

- Elected a Fellow of the Royal Society in 2026.
- A Fellowship of the Royal Academy of Engineering, awarded in 2012.
- A Fellowship of the IEEE, awarded in 2002.
