= Ronald M. Foster =

American mathematician (1896–1998)

Ronald Martin Foster (3 October 1896 – 2 February 1998), was an American mathematician at Bell Labs whose work was of significance regarding electronic filters for use on telephone lines. He published an important paper, A Reactance Theorem, (see Foster's reactance theorem) which quickly inspired Wilhelm Cauer to begin his program of network synthesis filters which put the design of filters on a firm mathematical footing. He is also known for the Foster census of cubic, symmetric graphs and the 90-vertex cubic symmetric Foster graph.

== Education ==
Foster was a Harvard College graduate S.B. (Mathematics), summa cum laude, Class of 1917. He also received two honorary Sc.D.s.

== Professional career ==
- 1917 – 1943 Research & Development Department (later Bell Labs), American Telephone & Telegraph, as a Research Engineer (Applied Mathematician), New York City, New York.
- 1943 – 1963 Professor and Head of Department of Mathematics, Polytechnic Institute of Brooklyn, Brooklyn, New York City, New York.

== Publications ==
- Campbell, GA, Foster, RM, Fourier Integrals for Practical Applications, "Bell System Technical Journal", pp. 639–707, 1928.
- Pierce, BO, Foster. RM. "A Short Table of Integrals", Fourth Edition, Ginn and Company, pp. 1–189, 1956.
