= Stephen Butterworth =

British physicist and engineer (1885–1958)

Stephen Butterworth OBE
- Born: 11 August 1885; Rochdale, Lancashire, England
- Died: 28 October 1958 (aged 73); Cowes, Isle of Wight, England

Stephen Butterworth OBE (1885–1958) was a British physicist who invented the filter that bears his name, a class of electrical circuits that separates electrical signals of different frequencies.

== Biography ==
Stephen Butterworth was born on 11 August 1885 in Rochdale, Lancashire, England (a town located about 10 miles north of the city of Manchester). He was the son of Alexander Butterworth, a postman, and Elizabeth (maiden name Wynn). He was the second of four children. In 1904, he entered the Victoria University of Manchester, from which he received, in 1907, both a Bachelor of Science degree in physics (first class) and a teacher's certificate (first class). In 1908, he received a Master of Science degree in physics. For the next 11 years, he was a physics lecturer at the Manchester Municipal College of Technology. He subsequently worked for several years at the National Physical Laboratory, where he did theoretical and experimental work for the determination of standards of electrical inductance. In 1921, he joined the Admiralty's Research Laboratory. Unfortunately, the classified nature of his work prohibited the publication of much of his research there. Nevertheless, it is known that he worked in a wide range of fields. For example, he determined the electromagnetic field around submarine cables carrying alternating current, and he investigated underwater explosions and the stability of torpedoes. In 1939, he was a "Principal Scientific Officer" at the Admiralty Research Laboratory in the Admiralty's Scientific Research and Experiment Department. During World War II, he investigated both magnetic mines and the degaussing of ships (as a means of protecting them from magnetic mines).

In 1942, he was awarded the Order of the British Empire. In 1945 he retired from the Admiralty Research Laboratory. He died on 28 October 1958 at his home in Cowes on the Isle of Wight, England at the age of 73.

== Publications ==
- S. Butterworth (December 1911) "On the vibration galvanometer and its application to inductance bridges," Proceedings of the Physical Society of London, vol. 24, pages 75–94.
- S. Butterworth (December 1911) "A method of measuring small inductances," Proceedings of the Physical Society of London, vol. 24, pages 210–214.
- S. Butterworth (December 1912) "On the evaluation of certain combinations of the Ber, Bei and allied functions," Proceedings of the Physical Society of London, vol. 25, pages 294–297.
- S. Butterworth (December 1913) "On a null method of testing vibration galvanometers," Proceedings of the Physical Society of London, vol. 26, pages 264–273.
- S. Butterworth (December 1914) "On the self-induction of solenoids of appreciable winding depths," Proceedings of the Physical Society of London, vol. 27, pages 371–383.
- S. Butterworth (December 1914) "On electrically-maintained vibrations," Proceedings of the Physical Society of London, vol. 27, pages 410–424.
- S. Butterworth (December 1919) "On the self-inductance of single-layer flat coils," Proceedings of the Physical Society of London, vol. 32, pages 31–37.
- S. Butterworth (December 1919) "The maintenance of a vibrating system by means of a triode valve," Proceedings of the Physical Society of London, vol. 32, pages 345–360.
- S. Butterworth (December 1920) "Capacity and eddy current effects in inductometers," Proceedings of the Physical Society of London, vol. 33, pages 312–354.
- S. Butterworth (December 1921) "On the use of Anderson's bridge for the measurement of the variations of the capacity and effective resistance of a condenser with frequency" Proceedings of the Physical Society of London, vol. 34, pages 1–7.
- S. Butterworth (December 1921) "Notes on Earth Capacity Effects in Alternating-Current Bridges," Proceedings of the Physical Society of London, vol. 34, pages 8–16.
- S. Butterworth (1922) "III. Eddy-current losses in cylindrical conductors, with special applications to the alternating current resistances of short coils," Philosophical Transactions of the Royal Society of London, Series A, vol. 222, pages 57–100.
- S. Butterworth (1924) "Note on the alternating current resistance of single layer coils," Physical Review, vol. 23, pages 752–755.
- S. Butterworth (1924) "The distribution of the magnetic field and return current round a submarine cable carrying alternating current. Part 2," Philosophical Transactions of the Royal Society of London. Series A, vol. 224, pages 141–184.
- S. Butterworth (1 April 1925) "On the alternating current resistance of solenoidal coils," Proceedings of the Royal Society of London. Series A, vol. 107, no. 744, pages 693–715.
- S. Butterworth (July 1925) "The high-frequency copper losses in inductance coils", Experimental Wireless and the Wireless Engineer, vol. 2, no. 22, pages 613–616.
- S. Butterworth, A. B. Wood, and E. H. Lakey (October 1926) "The use of a resonant shunt with an Einthoven string galvanometer," Journal of Scientific Instruments, vol. 4, no. 1, pages 8–18.
- S. Butterworth (1926) "Effective resistance of inductance coils at radio frequencies," Experimental Wireless and the Wireless Engineer, vol. 3, pages 203, 267, 417 and 483.
- S. Butterworth (1926) "Designing low-loss receiving coils," Wireless World, vol. 19, pages 754 and 811.
- S. Butterworth (January 1929) "The high frequency resistance of toroidal coils," Experimental Wireless and the Wireless Engineer, vol. 6, pages 13–16.
- S. Butterworth (November 1929) "Note on the apparent demodulation of a weak station by a stronger one," Experimental Wireless and the Wireless Engineer, vol. 6, no. 74, page 619.
- S. Butterworth (1930) "On the theory of filter amplifiers," Experimental Wireless and the Wireless Engineer, vol. 7, pp. 536–541. Available: https://www.changpuak.ch/electronics/downloads/On_the_Theory_of_Filter_Amplifiers.pdf
- S. Butterworth and F.D. Smith (1 March 1931) "The equivalent circuit of the magnetostriction oscillator," Proceedings of the Physical Society of London, vol. 43, no. 2, pages 166–185.

== Patents ==
- Stephen Butterworth and Leonard O. Cook, "Suspensions for deflectional instruments". British patent number: GB 433,080 (filed: 25 April 1934; published: 8 August 1935).
