= Positive-real function =

Complex mathematical function

Positive-real functions, often abbreviated to PR function or PRF, are a kind of mathematical function that first arose in electrical network synthesis. They are complex functions, Z(s), of a complex variable, s. A rational function is defined to have the PR property if it has a positive real part and is analytic in the right half of the complex plane and takes on real values on the real axis. That is:

$$\begin{align}
& \Re[Z(s)]>0 \quad\text{if}\quad \Re(s) > 0 \\
& \Im[Z(s)]=0 \quad\text{if}\quad \Im(s)=0
\end{align}$$

In electrical network analysis, Z(s) represents an impedance expression and s is the complex frequency variable, often expressed as its real and imaginary parts;

$$s=\sigma+i\omega \,\!$$

in which terms the PR condition can be stated;

$$\begin{align}
& \Re[Z(s)]>0 \quad\text{if}\quad \sigma > 0 \\
& \Im[Z(s)]=0 \quad\text{if}\quad \omega=0
\end{align}$$

The importance to network analysis of the PR condition lies in the realisability condition. Z(s) is realisable as a one-port rational impedance if and only if it meets the PR condition. Realisable in this sense means that the impedance can be constructed from a finite (hence rational) number of discrete ideal passive linear elements (resistors, inductors and capacitors in electrical terminology).

== Definition ==
The term positive-real function was originally defined by Otto Brune to describe any function Z(s) which

- is rational (the quotient of two polynomials),
- is real when s is real
- has positive real part when s has a positive real part

Many authors strictly adhere to this definition by explicitly requiring rationality, or by restricting attention to rational functions, at least in the first instance. However, a similar more general condition, not restricted to rational functions had earlier been considered by Cauer, and some authors ascribe the term positive-real to this type of condition, while others consider it to be a generalization of the basic definition.

== History ==
The condition was first proposed by Wilhelm Cauer (1926) who determined that it was a necessary condition. Otto Brune (1931) coined the term positive-real for the condition and proved that it was both necessary and sufficient for realisability.

== Properties ==
- The sum of two PR functions is PR.
- The composition of two PR functions is PR. In particular, if Z(s) is PR, then so are 1/Z(s) and Z(1/s).
- All the zeros and poles of a PR function are in the left half plane or on its boundary of the imaginary axis.
- Any poles and zeroes on the imaginary axis are simple (have a multiplicity of one).
- Any poles on the imaginary axis have real strictly positive residues, and similarly at any zeroes on the imaginary axis, the function has a real strictly positive derivative.
- Over the right half plane, the minimum value of the real part of a PR function occurs on the imaginary axis (because the real part of an analytic function constitutes a harmonic function over the plane, and therefore satisfies the maximum principle).
- For a rational PR function, the number of poles and number of zeroes differ by at most one.

== Generalizations ==
A couple of generalizations are sometimes made, with intention of characterizing the immittance functions of a wider class of passive linear electrical networks.

=== Irrational functions ===
The impedance Z(s) of a network consisting of an infinite number of components (such as a semi-infinite ladder), need not be a rational function of s, and in particular may have branch points in the left half s-plane. To accommodate such functions in the definition of PR, it is therefore necessary to relax the condition that the function be real for all real s, and only require this when s is positive. Thus, a possibly irrational function Z(s) is PR if and only if

- Z(s) is analytic in the open right half s-plane (Re[s] > 0)
- Z(s) is real when s is positive and real
- Re[Z(s)] ≥ 0 when Re[s] ≥ 0

Some authors start from this more general definition, and then particularize it to the rational case. The second condition is sometimes stated as: $Z(s^*) = (Z(s))^*$ in the open right half plane (which is equivalent given that the function is analytic there).

=== Matrix-valued functions ===
Linear electrical networks with more than one port may be described by impedance or admittance matrices. So by extending the definition of PR to matrix-valued functions, linear multi-port networks which are passive may be distinguished from those that are not. A possibly irrational matrix-valued function Z(s) is PR if and only if

- Each element of Z(s) is analytic in the open right half s-plane (Re[s] > 0)
- Each element of Z(s) is real when s is positive and real
- The Hermitian part (Z(s) + Z^{†}(s))/2 of Z(s) is positive semi-definite when Re[s] ≥ 0

== Test ==
By definition, for a given rational function $Z(s)$ to be PR, it must have positive real part at every point in the right half $s$-plane. However it is not necessary to examine the entire half-plane to test whether this is the case.

=== Necessary and sufficient conditions ===
A necessary condition for PR is that $Z(s)$ has no poles in the open right half plane. In any region free from poles, the real part, $\mathrm{Re}(Z(s))$ is a harmonic function, and so by the maximum principle can have no true extrema. The minimum and maximum values of $\mathrm{Re}(Z(s))$ over the pole-free region must therefore occur on the boundary of that region, which for the right half-plane is the imaginary axis plus the point at infinity. Examination of the right half $s$-plane is thus reduced to examination of the imaginary axis (taken to include the point at infinity).

Precise necessary and sufficient conditions for a given rational function $Z(s)$ to be PR are:

- $Z(s)$ is real when $s$ is real
- $Z(s)$ has no poles in the open right half $s$-plane.
- $\mathrm{Re}(Z(s)) \geqslant 0$ at all points on the imaginary $s$-axis, other than at any poles.
- Any poles of $Z(s)$ on the imaginary $s$-axis are simple (have a multiplicity of one), and have real positive residue.

=== Point at infinity ===
In checking poles on the imaginary axis, it is not sufficient to consider just the zeroes of the denominator of $Z(s)$, but also necessary to examine any pole at infinity (the case when $Z(s)$ is infinite for infinite $s$). For example, the function $Z(s) = - s$ is not PR because it has a pole at infinity with negative residue, and the function $Z(s) = s^{3}$ is not PR because it has a non-simple pole at infinity. This means that a rational function can be immediately classified as non-PR if the degrees of its numerator and denominator differ by more than one, since then the function or its reciprocal have a higher order pole at infinity. Similarly, if either the numerator or denominator is lacking both constant and first degree terms, then function or its reciprocal has a higher order pole at zero, and so the function is not PR.

=== Poles and zeroes ===
A function is PR if and only if its reciprocal is PR. The poles of the reciprocal are the zeroes of the original function. It is therefore possible to test whether a function is PR by examining its value on the imaginary axis and the disposition of either its poles or its zeroes. Checking both poles and zeroes does not however obviate the need to examine the imaginary axis. Having all poles and all zeroes in the left half-plane is a necessary but not sufficient condition for PR.
