= Sidney Darlington =

Electrical engineer and inventor of a transistor configuration

- Born: July 18, 1906; Pittsburgh, Pennsylvania, U.S.
- Died: October 31, 1997 (aged 91); Exeter, New Hampshire, U.S.
- Education: Harvard, MIT, Columbia
- Known for: Chirp modulation Darlington pair Darlington synthesis
- Awards: IEEE Edison Medal (1975); IEEE Medal of Honor (1981); Presidential Medal of Freedom
- Scientific career
- Fields: Electrical engineering Communication Theory

Sidney Darlington (July 18, 1906 – October 31, 1997) was an American electrical engineer and inventor of a transistor configuration in 1953, the Darlington pair. He advanced the state of network theory, developing the insertion-loss synthesis approach, invented chirp radar, and contributed to the designs of bombsights and gun and rocket guidance.

Darlington was awarded a B.S. in physics, magna cum laude, from Harvard in 1928, where he was elected to Phi Beta Kappa. He also received a B.S. in E.E. from MIT in 1929, and a Ph.D. in physics from Columbia in 1940.

In 1945, he was awarded the Presidential Medal of Freedom, the United States' highest civilian honor, for his contributions during World War II. He was an elected member of the National Academy of Engineering, which cited his contributions to electrical network theory, radar, and guidance systems. In 1975, he received IEEE's Edison Medal "For basic contributions to network theory and for important inventions in radar systems and electronic circuits" and the IEEE Medal of Honor in 1981 "For fundamental contributions to filtering and signal processing leading to chirp radar".

He died at his home in Exeter, New Hampshire, USA, at the age of 91.

== Patents ==
- U.S. patent 1,991,195 — Wave Transmission Network
- U.S. patent 2,663,806 — Semiconductor signal translating devices.(ed., "Darlington Transistor")
- U.S. patent 2,438,112 — Bombsight Computer
- U.S. patent 2,468,179 — Tracking Device
- U.S. patent 2,658,675 — Fire Control Computer
- U.S. patent 2,678,997 — Pulse Transmission(Chirp)
- U.S. patent 3,008,668 — Rocket Guidance
- U.S. patent 3,265,973 — Two-Port Network Synthesis
- U.S. patent 3,618,095 — Chirp Pulse Equalizer
