= Antimetric electrical network =

Electrical network that exhibits anti-symmetrical electrical properties

An antimetric electrical network is an electrical network that exhibits anti-symmetrical electrical properties. The term is often encountered in filter theory, but it applies to general electrical network analysis. Antimetric is the diametrical opposite of symmetric; it does not merely mean "asymmetric" (i.e., "lacking symmetry"). It is possible for networks to be symmetric or antimetric in their electrical properties without being physically or topologically symmetric or antimetric.

== Definition ==
Figure 1. Examples of symmetry and antimetry: both networks are low-pass filters but one is symmetric (left) and the other is antimetric (right). For a symmetric ladder the 1st element is equal to the nth, the 2nd equal to the (n-1)th and so on. For an antimetric ladder, the 1st element is the dual of the nth and so on.

References to symmetry and antimetry of a network usually refer to the input impedances (Note: input impedance. The input impedance of a port is the impedance measured across that network port with nothing connected to it externally and all other ports terminated with a defined impedance.) of a two-port network when correctly terminated. (Note: "correctly terminated". This will most usually mean termination with the system nominal impedance which, in turn, is usually chosen to equal the nominal characteristic impedance of the system transmission lines. This is the impedance the circuit is expected to be connected to in operation and impedance matching is of some importance in telecommunications. In some design contexts a more theoretical impedance is considered such as image impedance.) A symmetric network will have two equal input impedances, Z_{i1} and Z_{i2}. For an antimetric network, the two impedances must be the dual of each other with respect to some nominal impedance R_{0}. That is,

$$\frac {Z_{i1}}{R_0} = \frac {R_0}{Z_{i2}}$$

or equivalently

$$Z_{i1} Z_{i2} = {R_0}^2.$$

It is necessary for antimetry that the terminating impedances are also the dual of each other, but in many practical cases the two terminating impedances are resistors and are both equal to the nominal impedance R_{0}. Hence, they are both symmetric and antimetric at the same time.

== Physical and electrical antimetry ==
Figure 2. Adding another T-section to the ladders of figure 1

Figure 3. Examples of symmetric (top) and antimetric (bottom) networks which do not exhibit topological symmetry nor antimetry.

Symmetric and antimetric networks are often also topologically symmetric and antimetric, respectively. The physical arrangement of their components and values are symmetric or antimetric as in the ladder example above. However, it is not a necessary condition for electrical antimetry. For example, if the example networks of figure 1 have an additional identical T-section added to the left-hand side as shown in figure 2, then the networks remain topologically symmetric and antimetric. However, the network resulting from the application of Bartlett's bisection theorem applied to the first T-section in each network, as shown in figure 3, are neither physically symmetric nor antimetric but retain their electrical symmetric (in the first case) and antimetric (in the second case) properties.

== Two-port parameters ==
The conditions for symmetry and antimetry can be stated in terms of two-port parameters. For a two-port network described by normalized impedance parameters (z-parameters),

$$z_{11} = z_{22}$$

if the network is symmetric, and

$$z_{11}z_{22} - z_{12}z_{21} = 1$$

if the network is antimetric. Passive networks of the kind illustrated in this article are also reciprocal, which requires that

$$z_{12} = z_{21}$$

and results in a normalized z-parameter matrix of,

$$\left [ \mathbf z \right ] = \begin{bmatrix} z_{11} & z_{12} \\ z_{12} & z_{11} \end{bmatrix}$$

for symmetric networks and

$$\left [ \mathbf z \right ] = \begin{bmatrix} z_{11} & z_{12} \\ z_{12} & (z_{12}^2+1)/z_{11} \end{bmatrix}$$

for antimetric networks.

For a two-port network described by scattering parameters (S-parameters),

$$S_{11} = S_{22}$$

if the network is symmetric, and

$$S_{11} = -S_{22}$$

if the network is antimetric. The condition for reciprocity is,

$$S_{12} = S_{21}$$

resulting in an S-parameter matrix of,

$$\left [ \mathbf S \right ] = \begin{bmatrix} S_{11} & S_{12} \\ S_{12} & S_{11} \end{bmatrix}$$

for symmetric networks and

$$\left [ \mathbf S \right ] = \begin{bmatrix} S_{11} & S_{12} \\ S_{12} & -S_{11} \end{bmatrix}$$

for antimetric networks.

== Applications ==
Some circuit designs naturally output antimetric networks. For instance, a low-pass Butterworth filter implemented as a ladder network with an even number of elements will be antimetric. Similarly, a bandpass Butterworth with an even number of resonators will be antimetric, as will a Butterworth mechanical filter with an even number of mechanical resonators.
