= Analogical models =

Relation of types of systems with corresponding dynamics

A mechanical network diagram of a simple resonator (top) and one electrical network with an equivalent structure and behaviour (bottom), then, an analog for it.

Analogical models are a method of representing a phenomenon of the world, often called the "target system" by another, more understandable or analysable system. They are also called dynamical analogies.

Two open systems have analog representations (see illustration) if they are black box isomorphic systems.

== Explanation ==
A simple type of analogy is one that is based on shared properties; and analogizing is the process of representing information about a particular subject (the analogue or source system) by another particular subject (the target system), in order "to illustrate some particular aspect (or clarify selected attributes) of the primary domain".

Analogical models, also called "analog" or "analogue" models, seek the analogous systems that share properties with the target system as a means of representing the world. It is often practicable to construct source systems that are smaller and/or faster than the target system so that one can deduce a priori knowledge of target system behaviour. Analog devices are therefore those in which may differ in substance or structure but share properties of dynamic behaviour (Truit and Rogers, p. 1-3).

dynamical analogies establish the analogies between electrical, mechanical, acoustical, magnetic and electronic systems: Olson (1958), p. 2.

For example, in analog electronic circuits, one can use voltage to represent an arithmetic quantity; operational amplifiers might then represent the arithmetic operations (addition, subtraction, multiplication, and division). Through the process of calibration these smaller/bigger, slower/faster systems are scaled up or down so that they match the functioning of the target system, and are therefore called analogs of the target system. Once the calibration has taken place, modellers speak of a one-to-one correspondence in behaviour between the primary system and its analog. Thus the behaviour of two systems can be determined by experimenting with one.

== Creating an analogical model ==
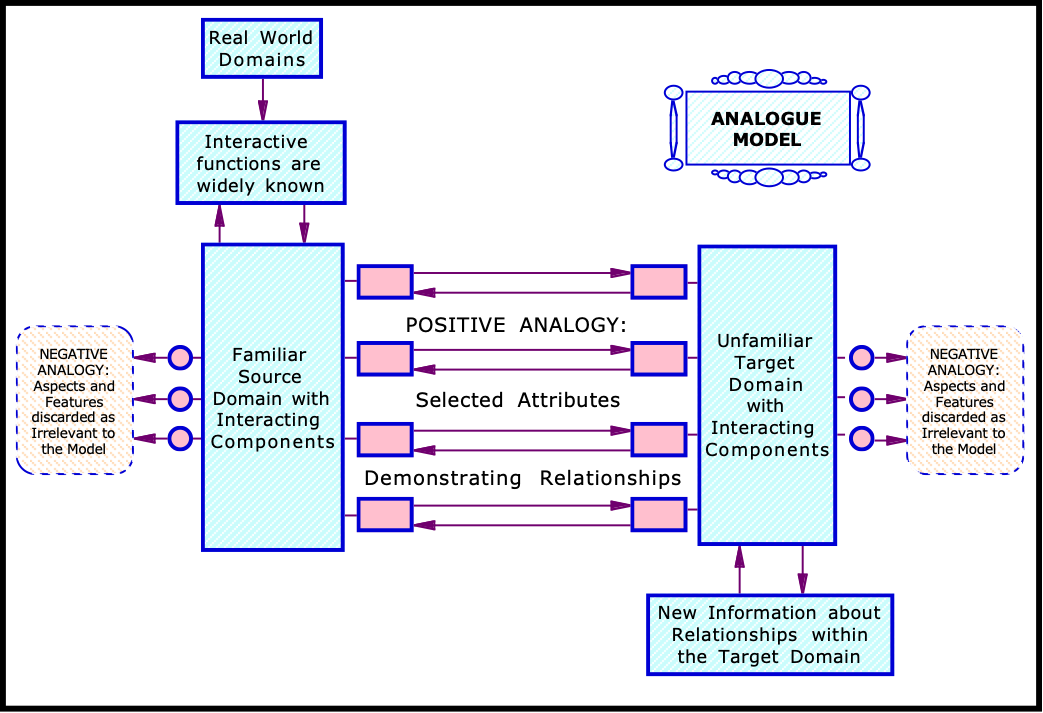
The Mechanism of the Analogue Model.

Many different instruments and systems can be used to create an analogical model.

"Many important discoveries have been made when scientists commenced their work as if their theoretically postulated models of atoms, viruses, vitamins, hormones, and genes had actual, real world substantial existence. They proceeded as though each imaginary concept actually existed in precisely the form their theoretical speculation outlined; and, discarding any pretence of analogy, they proceeded with the view that the substantial, real world was exactly as they had theoretically described it. ... Consider the analogue model advanced to assist understanding of the behaviour of gases which suggests possible relationships between some theoretical activities of gas particles and some observable activities of billiard-balls. Achinstein (1964, p.332) reminds us that, despite thinking about gases in this useful way, "the physicist obviously supposes that molecules, not billiard balls, comprise gases" — Yeates (2004, pp.71, 73)

A mechanical device can be used to represent mathematical calculations. For instance, the Phillips Hydraulic Computer MONIAC used the flow of water to model economic systems (the target system); electronic circuits can be used to represent both physiological and ecological systems. When a model is run on either an analog or digital computer this is known as the process of simulation.

== Mechanical analogies ==
Any number of systems could be used for mapping electrical phenomena to mechanical phenomena, but two principle systems are commonly used: the impedance analogy and the mobility analogy. The impedance analogy maps force to voltage whereas the mobility analogy maps force to current.

The impedance analogy preserves the analogy between electrical impedance and mechanical impedance but does not preserve the network topology. The mobility analogy preserves the network topology but does not preserve the analogy between impedances. Both preserve the correct energy and power relationships by making power conjugate pairs of variables analogous.

== Hydraulic analogy ==
- In a hydraulic analogy, a water integrator might perform the mathematical operation of integration.

== Physiological analogies ==
- Francis Crick used the study of the visual system as a proxy for the study of awareness.

== Formal analogies ==
- "The same equations have the same solutions." -- Richard Feynman
  - For example, the inverse-square laws of gravitation and electromagnetism can be described by analogous equations on a geometrical basis, almost without regard to the physical details about masses and charges.
  - In population ecology, differential equations arise that are the same as those found in mechanics, albeit with different interpretations.
- Recursion requires a similarity within a situation; for example, Archimedes used the myriad to count the number of grains of sand on a beach by using the concept of myriad myriads.

== Dynamical analogies ==
Dynamical analogies establish analogies between systems in different energy domains by means of comparison of the system dynamic equations. There are many ways such analogies can be built, but one of the most useful methods is to form analogies between pairs of power conjugate variables. That is, a pair of variables whose product is power. Doing so preserves the correct energy flow between domains, a useful feature when modelling a system as an integrated whole. Examples of systems that require unified modelling are mechatronics and audio electronics.

The earliest such analogy is due to James Clerk Maxwell who, in 1873, associated mechanical force with electrical voltage. This analogy became so widespread that sources of voltage are still today referred to as electromotive force. The power conjugate of voltage is electric current which, in the Maxwell analogy, maps to mechanical velocity. Electrical impedance is the ratio of voltage and current, so by analogy, mechanical impedance is the ratio of force and velocity. The concept of impedance can be extended to other domains, for instance in acoustics and fluid flow it is the ratio of pressure to rate of flow. In general, impedance is the ratio of an effort variable and the flow variable that results. For this reason, the Maxwell analogy is often referred to as the impedance analogy, although the concept of impedance was not conceived until 1886 by Oliver Heaviside, some time after Maxwell's death.

Specifying power conjugate variables still does not result in a unique analogy, there are multiple ways the conjugates and analogies can be specified. A new analogy was proposed by Floyd A. Firestone in 1933 now known as the mobility analogy. In this analogy electrical impedance is made analogous to mechanical mobility (the inverse of mechanical impedance). Firestone's idea was to make analogous variables that are measured across an element, and make analogous variables that flow through an element. For instance, the across variable voltage is the analogy of velocity, and the through variable current is the analogy of force. Firestone's analogy has the advantage of preserving the topology of element connections when converting between domains. A modified form of the through and across analogy was proposed in 1955 by Horace M. Trent and is the modern understanding of through and across.

Comparison of various power conjugate analogies for electrical, mechanical, rotational, and fluid flow domains
	Impedance analogy (Maxwell)	Mobility analogy (Firestone)	Through and across analogy (Trent)
Effort or across power conjugates	V, F, T, p	V, u, ω, Q	V, u, ω, p
Flow or through power conjugates	I, u, ω, Q	I, F, T, p	I, F, T, Q

where
V is voltage
F is force
T is torque
p is pressure
I is electric current
u is velocity
ω is angular velocity
Q is volumetric flow rate

=== Table of equivalents ===
Table of equivalents under the through and across system
	Through variable	Across variable	Energy storage 1	Energy storage 2	Energy dissipation
Electrical	Current (I)	Voltage (V)	Capacitor (C)	Inductor (L)	Resistor (R)
Mechanical linear	Velocity (u)	Force (F)	Spring (K)	Mass (M)	Damper (B)
Mechanical rotational	Angular velocity (ω)	Torque (T)	Torsion spring (κ)	Moment of inertia (I)	Rotary damper
Hydraulic	Volume flow	Pressure (p)	Tank	Mass	Valve

=== Hamiltonian variables ===
The Hamiltonian variables, also called the energy variables, are those variables which when time-differentiated are equal to the power conjugate variables. The Hamiltonian variables are so called because they are the variables which usually appear in Hamiltonian mechanics. The Hamiltonian variables in the electrical domain are charge (q) and flux linkage (λ) because

$\frac {d \lambda}{dt} = v$ (Faraday's law of induction) and $\frac {dq}{dt} = i.$

In the translational mechanical domain, the Hamiltonian variables are distance displacement (x) and momentum (p) because

$\frac {dp}{dt} = F$ (Newton's second law of motion) and $\frac {dx}{dt} = u.$

There is a corresponding relationship for other analogies and sets of variables. The Hamiltonian variables are also called the energy variables. The integrand of a power conjugate variable with respect to a Hamiltonian variable is a measure of energy. For instance,

$\int F \, dx$ and $\int u \, dp$

are both expressions of energy.

=== Practical uses ===
Maxwell's analogy was initially used merely to help explain electrical phenomena in more familiar mechanical terms. The work of Firestone, Trent and others moved the field well beyond this, looking to represent systems of multiple energy domains as a single system. In particular, designers started converting the mechanical parts of an electromechanical system to the electrical domain so that the whole system could be analyzed as an electrical circuit. Vannevar Bush was a pioneer of this kind of modelling in his development of analogue computers, and a coherent presentation of this method was presented in a 1925 paper by Clifford A. Nickle.

From the 1950s onward, manufacturers of mechanical filters, notably Collins Radio, widely used these analogies in order to take the well -developed theory of filter design in electrical engineering and apply it to mechanical systems. The quality of filters required for radio applications could not be achieved with electrical components. Much better quality resonators (higher Q factor) could be made with mechanical parts but there was no equivalent filter theory in mechanical engineering. It was also necessary to have the mechanical parts, the transducers, and the electrical components of the circuit analyzed as a complete system in order to predict the overall response of the filter.

Harry F. Olson helped popularise the use of dynamical analogies in the audio electronics field with his book dynamical analogies first published in 1943.

=== Non-power-conjugate analogies ===
A common analogy of magnetic circuits maps magnetomotive force (mmf) to voltage and magnetic flux (φ) to electric current. However, mmf and φ are not power conjugate variables. The product of these is not in units of power and the ratio, known as magnetic reluctance, does not measure the rate of dissipation of energy so is not a true impedance. Where a compatible analogy is required, mmf can be used as the effort variable and dφ/dt (rate of change of magnetic flux) will then be the flow variable. This is known as the gyrator-capacitor model.

A widely used analogy in the thermal domain maps temperature difference as the effort variable and thermal power as the flow variable. Again, these are not power conjugate variables, and the ratio, known as thermal resistance, is not really an analogy of either impedance or electrical resistance as far as energy flows are concerned. A compatible analogy could take temperature difference as the effort variable and entropy flow rate as the flow variable.

=== Generalisation ===
Many applications of dynamical models convert all energy domains in the system into an electrical circuit and then proceed to analyse the complete system in the electrical domain. There are, however, more generalised methods of representation. One such representation is through the use of bond graphs, introduced by Henry M. Paynter in 1960. It is usual to use the force-voltage analogy (impedance analogy) with bond graphs, but it is not a requirement to do so. Likewise Trent used a different representation (linear graphs) and his representation has become associated with the force-current analogy (mobility analogy), but again this is not mandatory.

Some authors discourage the use of domain specific terminology for the sake of generalisation. For instance, because much of the theory of dynamical analogies arose from electrical theory the power conjugate variables are sometimes called V-type and I-type according to whether they are analogs of voltage or current respectively in the electrical domain. Likewise, the Hamiltonian variables are sometimes called generalised momentum and generalised displacement according to whether they are analogs of momentum or displacement in the mechanical domain.

== Electronic circuit analogies ==
=== Functional analogs ===
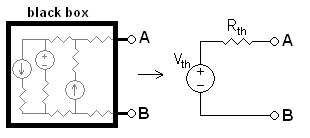
Any black box containing resistances only, with voltage and current sources, can be replaced to a Thévenin equivalent circuit, to show the same behavior.

Functional analogs (or functional analogues) are entities (models, representations, etc.) that can be replaced, to fulfill the same function. When the entities in question are formally represented by black boxes, the concept of analog is related to "same behavior": they take the same output sequence when submitted to the same input sequence.

=== Hydraulic analogy ===
A fluid or hydraulic analogy of an electric circuit attempts to explain circuitry intuitively in terms of plumbing, where water is analogous to the mobile sea of charge within metals, pressure difference is analogous to voltage, and water's flow rate is analogous to electric current.

=== Analogue computers ===
Electronic circuits were used to model and simulate engineering systems such as aeroplanes and nuclear power plants before digital computers became widely available with fast enough turn over times to be practically useful. Electronic circuit instruments called analog computers were used to speed up circuit construction time. However analog computers like the Norden bombsight could also consist of gears and pulleys in calculation.

Examples are Vogel and Ewel who published 'An Electrical Analog of a Trophic Pyramid' (1972, Chpt 11, pp. 105–121), Elmore and Sands (1949) who published circuits devised for research in nuclear physics and the study of fast electrical transients done under the Manhattan Project (however no circuits having application to weapon technology were included for security reasons), and Howard T. Odum (1994) who published circuits devised to analogically model ecological-economic systems at many scales of the geobiosphere. In contrast to the analog models mentioned above analog computers are more abstract as they only represent purely mathematical equations.

== Philosophical conundrum ==
The process of analogical modelling has philosophical difficulties. As noted in the Stanford Encyclopedia of Philosophy, there is the question of how the physical/biological laws of the target system relate to the analogical models created by humans to represent the target system. We seem to assume that the process of constructing analogical models gives us access to the fundamental laws governing the target system. However strictly speaking we only have empirical knowledge of the laws that hold true for the analogical system, and if the time constant for the target system is larger than the life cycle of human being (as in the case of the geobiosphere) it is therefore very difficult for any single human to empirically verify the validity of the extension of the laws of their model to the target system in their lifetime.

== See also ==
- Analogy
- Conceptual metaphor
- Conceptual model
- General purpose analog computer
- Homomorphism
- Inquiry
- Isomorphism
- Metaphor
- MONIAC
- Morphism
- Paradigm
- Wind tunnel

== Bibliography ==
- Achinstein, Peter (1964), "Models, Analogies, and Theories", Philosophy of Science, Vol.31, No.4, (October 1964), pp.328-350. doi:10.1086/288018
- Bishop, Robert H. (2005) Mechatronics: An Introduction, CRC Press ISBN 1420037242.
- Borutzky, Wolfgang (2009) Bond Graph Methodology, Springer ISBN 1848828829.
- Busch-Vishniac, Ilene J., Electromechanical Sensors and Actuators, Springer Science & Business Media, 1999 ISBN 038798495X.
- Care, Charles (2010) Technology for Modelling: Electrical Analogies, Engineering Practice, and the Development of Analogue Computing, Springer ISBN 1848829485.
- Carr, Joseph J. (2002) RF Components and Circuits, Oxford: Newnes ISBN 0-7506-4844-9.
- Colyvan, Mark and Ginzburg, Lev R. (2010) "Analogical Thinking in Ecology: Looking Beyond Disciplinary Boundaries", The Quarterly Review of Biology, 85(2): 171–82. Archived 2023-04-07 at the Wayback Machine JSTOR 652321 doi:10.1086/652321
- Elmore, William C. and Sands, Matthew (1949) Electronics: Experimental Techniques, National Nuclear Energy Series, Manhattan Project Technical Section, Division V, Vol. 1, New York: McGraw-Hill.
- Ginzburg, Lev and Colyvan, Mark (2004) Ecological Orbits: How Planets Move and Populations Grow, Oxford University Press, New York.ISBN 978-0-1980-3754-5
- Hamill, David C. (1993) "Lumped equivalent circuits of magnetic components: the gyrator-capacitor approach", IEEE Transactions on Power Electronics, vol. 8, iss. 2, pp. 97–103. doi:10.1109/63.223957
- Heaviside, Oliver (1893) "A gravitational and electromagnetic analogy". The Electrician.
- Libbey, Robert (1994) Signal And Image Processing Sourcebook, Springer ISBN 0442308612.
- Martinsen, Orjan G.; Grimnes, Sverre (2011) Bioimpedance and Bioelectricity Basics, Academic Press ISBN 0080568807.
- Odum, Howard T. (1994) Ecological and General Systems: and introduction to systems ecology, Colorado University Press.
- Olson, Harry F. (1958) Dynamical Analogies, 2nd ed., Van Nostrand, 1958 OCLC 1450867 (first published 1943).
- Regtien, Paul P. L. (2002) Sensors for Mechatronics, Elsevier, 2012 ISBN 0123944090.
- Smith, Malcolm C. (2002) "Synthesis of mechanical networks: the inerter]", IEEE Transactions on Automatic Control, vol. 47, iss. 10, pp. 1648–1662, October 2002. doi:10.1109/TAC.2002.803532
- Taylor, John T.; Huang, Qiuting (1997) CRC Handbook of Electrical Filters, Boca Raton: CRC Press ISBN 0-8493-8951-8.
- Truit and Rogers (1960) Basics of analog computers, John F. Rider Publishing, Inc., New York.
- Vogel and Ewel (1972) A Model Menagerie: Laboratory Studies about Living Systems, Addison-Wesley.
- Yeates, Lindsay B. (2004), "Comparative Cognitive Processes", pp.40-76 in L.B. Yeates, Thought Experimentation: A Cognitive Approach, Graduate Diploma in Arts (By Research) Dissertation, University of New South Wales, 2004.
