= Floyd Firestone =

American acoustical physicist (1898–1986)

Floyd Alburn Firestone
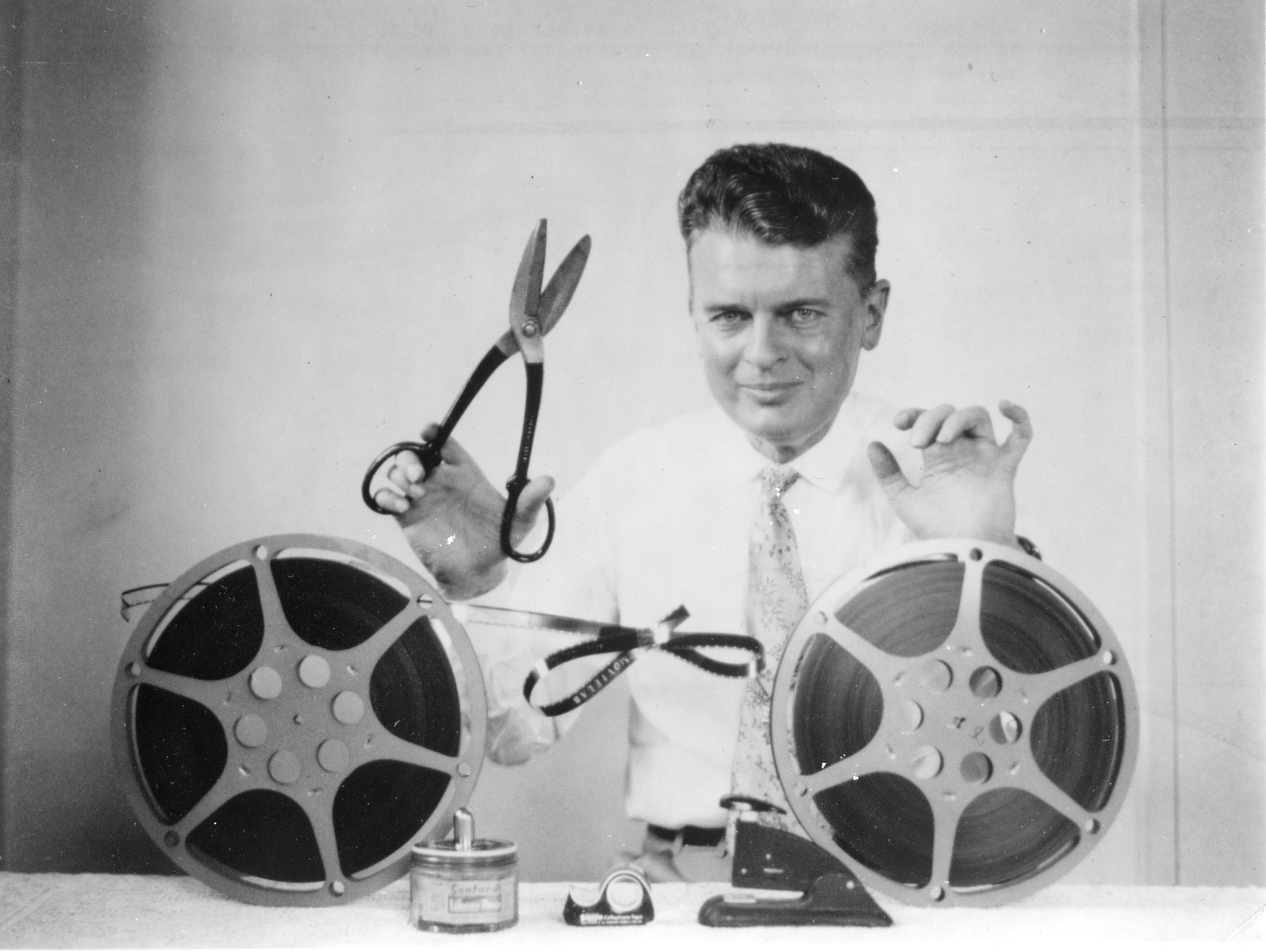
- Firestone tries splicing the commemorative film which was made of the occasion of the 25th Anniversary Celebration of the Acoustical Society of America, c. 1954
- Born: September 21, 1898; Marysville, Ohio, U.S.
- Died: January 6, 1986 (aged 87); Westchester, New York, U.S.
- Known for: Mobility analogy; Ultrasonic testing; Abbott-Firestone curve
- Scientific career
- Fields: Acoustics
- Workplaces: University of Michigan
- Thesis: The Phase Difference and Amplitude Ratio at the Ears due to a Source of Pure Tone (1931)

Floyd Alburn Firestone (September 21, 1898 – January 6, 1986) was an acoustical physicist, engineer and inventor, who was a professor of physics at University of Michigan. Best known for introducing the mobility analogy and inventing the first practical ultrasonic testing method, he was the president of Acoustical Society of America from 1943 to 1945.

== Career ==
Firestone was born on September 21, 1898 in Shiloh, Richland County, Ohio,. earned a B.S. from the Case School of Applied Science in 1921, and his Ph.D. from the University of Michigan in 1931.

In January 1925, Firestone demonstrated an electrical apparatus for determining the loudness of noise from bearings or other sources. The instrument was a modified audiometer consisted essentially by means of a Wente microphone combined with a sensitive electronic circuits and alternating current voltmeter; this was the first time that a full electronic device was used to measure the noise level regardless the source type.

In 1933, Firestone proposed an alternative to the mechanical–electrical analogy of James Clerk Maxwell in which force is made the analogy of voltage (the impedance analogy). Firestone's analogy (later called the mobility analogy) makes force the analog of current. In this work he introduced the concept of "through" and "across" variables and demonstrated that there were analogies for these variables in other energy domains, making it possible to treat a complex system as a unified whole in analysis. Firestone's analogy became popular amongst mechanical filter designers because it has the property of preserving network topologies when transforming between the mechanical and electrical domains.

In 1940 while a professor at the University of Michigan, Firestone invented the first practical ultrasonic testing method and apparatus. He was granted U.S. patent 2,280,226 for the invention in 1942. Manufactured by Sperry Corporation, the testing device was known variously as the Firestone-Sperry Reflectoscope, the Sperry Ultrasonic Reflectoscope, the Sperry Reflectoscope and sometimes the Supersonic Reflectoscope, the name Firestone had coined for the instrument. The technology is not just used in quality control in factories to reject defective parts before shipment, but also revolutionized transportation safety. For example, ultrasonic testing is used for safety maintenance inspection of railroad cars, particularly axles and wheels, aircraft, particularly fuselages, and other transportation vessels for material fatigue. Firestone's ultrasonic pulse echo technique for metal defect testing was also later applied in medical diagnosis, giving birth to the field of echocardiography and to the field of medical ultrasonography, generally.

Firestone was the editor of the Journal of the Acoustical Society of America from 1939 to 1957. Among Firestone's other inventions, were in a single year an “automatic device for the minute inspection of flaws”, “a new and useful improvement in hook-up of electrical apparatus”, and “[a] device for measuring noise”, and, even, later a “musical typewriter”.

Firestone was elected a fellow of the American Physical Society in January 1936. He was a fellow of the Acoustical Society of America (ASA) and its president from 1943 to 1945. In 1955 Floyd A. Firestone got the Gold Medal Award of the ASA.

== Papers ==
- Firestone, Floyd A (1933). "A new analogy between mechanical and electrical system elements". The Journal of the Acoustical Society of America. 4 (3): 249–267. doi:10.1121/1.1915605.
- Firestone, Floyd A. (1946). The Supersonic Reflectoscope, An instrument for inspecting the interior of solid parts by means of sound waves. Journal of the Acoustical Society of America, 17(3), 287–299, Full Article

== See also ==
- Nondestructive testing
