= Elastance =

Inverse of electrical capacitance

Electrical elastance is the reciprocal of capacitance. The SI unit of elastance is the inverse farad (F^{−1}). The concept is not widely used by electrical and electronic engineers, as the value of capacitors is typically specified in units of capacitance rather than inverse capacitance. However, elastance is used in theoretical work in network analysis and has some niche applications, particularly at microwave frequencies.

The term elastance was coined by Oliver Heaviside through the analogy of a capacitor to a spring. The term is also used for analogous quantities in other energy domains. In the mechanical domain, it corresponds to stiffness, and it is the inverse of compliance in the fluid flow domain, especially in physiology. It is also the name of the generalized quantity in bond-graph analysis and other schemes that analyze systems across multiple domains.

== Usage ==
The definition of capacitance (C) is the charge (Q) stored per unit voltage (V).

$$C = {Q \over V}$$

Elastance (S) is the reciprocal of capacitance, thus,

$$S = {V \over Q} \ .$$

Expressing the values of capacitors as elastance is not commonly done by practical electrical engineers, but can be convenient for capacitors in series since their total elastance is simply the sum of their individual elastances. However, elastance is sometimes used by network theorists in their analyses. One advantage of using elastance is that an increase in elastance results in an increase in impedance, aligning with the behavior of the other two basic passive elements, resistance and inductance. An example of the use of elastance can be found in the 1926 doctoral thesis of Wilhelm Cauer. On his path to founding network synthesis, he developed the loop matrix A:

$$\mathbf{A} = s^2 \mathbf{L} + s \mathbf{R} + \mathbf{S} = s \mathbf{Z}$$

where L, R, S, and Z are the network loop matrices of inductance, resistance, elastance, and impedance, respectively, and s is complex frequency. This expression would be significantly more complicated if Cauer had used a matrix of capacitances instead of elastances. The use of elastance here is primarily for mathematical convenience, similar to how mathematicians use radians rather than more common units for angles.

Elastance is also applied in microwave engineering. In this field, varactor diodes are used as voltage-variable capacitors in devices such as frequency multipliers, parametric amplifiers, and variable filters. These diodes store charge in their junction when reverse biased, which generates the capacitor effect. The slope of the voltage-stored charge curve in this context is referred to as differential elastance.

== Units ==
The SI unit of elastance is the reciprocal of the farad (F^{−1}). The term daraf is sometimes used for this unit, but it is not approved by the SI and its use is discouraged. The term daraf is formed by reversing the word farad, in much the same way as the unit mho (a unit of conductance, also not approved by the SI) is formed by writing ohm backwards.

The term daraf was coined by Arthur E. Kennelly, who used it as early as 1920.

== History ==
The terms elastance and elastivity were coined by Oliver Heaviside in 1886. Heaviside coined many of the terms used in circuit analysis today, such as impedance, inductance, admittance, and conductance. His terminology followed the model of resistance and resistivity, with the -ance ending used for extensive properties and the -ivity ending used for intensive properties. Extensive properties are used in circuit analysis (they represent the "values" of components), while intensive properties are used in field analysis. Heaviside's nomenclature was designed to emphasize the connection between corresponding quantities in fields and circuits.

Elastivity is the intensive property of a material, corresponding to the bulk property of a component, elastance. It is the reciprocal of permittivity. As Heaviside stated,

Permittivity gives rise to permittance, and elastivity to elastance.

— Oliver Heaviside

Here, permittance is Heaviside's term for capacitance. He rejected any terminology that implied a capacitor acted as a container for holding charge. He opposed the terms capacity (capacitance) and capacious (capacitive) along with their inverses, incapacity and incapacious. At the time, the capacitor was often referred to as a condenser (suggesting that the "electric fluid" could be condensed), or as a leyden, after the Leyden jar, an early capacitor, both implying storage. Heaviside preferred a mechanical analogy, viewing the capacitor as a compressed spring, which led to his preference for terms suggesting properties of a spring.

Heaviside's views followed James Clerk Maxwell's perspective on electric current, or at least Heaviside's interpretation of it. According to this view, electric current is analogous to velocity, driven by the electromotive force, similar to a mechanical force. At a capacitor, current creates a "displacement" whose rate of change is equivalent to the current. This displacement was seen as an electric strain, like mechanical strain in a compressed spring. Heaviside denied the idea of physical charge flow and accumulation on capacitor plates, replacing it with the concept of the divergence of the displacement field at the plates, which was numerically equal to the charge collected in the flow view.

In the late 19th and early 20th centuries, some authors adopted Heaviside's terms elastance and elastivity. Today, however, the reciprocal terms capacitance and permittivity are almost universally preferred by electrical engineers. Despite this, elastance still sees occasional use in theoretical work. Later, in 1945, Bode used the term stiffness (D)

$$D = {1 \over C}$$

instead of elastance in his book. Similar to Cauer ... in order to simplify later equations. The term stiffness also didn't find widespread adoption.

One of Heaviside's motivations for choosing these terms was to distinguish them from mechanical terms. Thus, he selected elastivity rather than elasticity to avoid the need to clarify between electrical elasticity and mechanical elasticity.

Heaviside carefully crafted his terminology to be unique to electromagnetism, specifically avoiding overlaps with mechanics. Ironically, many of his terms were later borrowed back into mechanics and other domains to describe analogous properties. For example, it is now necessary to differentiate electrical impedance from mechanical impedance in some contexts. Elastance has also been used by some authors in mechanics to describe the analogous quantity, though stiffness is often preferred. However, elastance is widely used for the analogous property in the domain of fluid dynamics, particularly in fields such as biomedicine and physiology.

== Mechanical analogy ==
Mechanical–electrical analogies are established by comparing the mathematical descriptions of mechanical and electrical systems. Quantities that occupy corresponding positions in equations of the same form are referred to as analogues. There are two main reasons for creating such analogies.

The first reason is to explain electrical phenomena in terms of more familiar mechanical systems. For example, the differential equations governing an electrical RLC circuit (inductor-capacitor-resistor circuit) are of the same form as those governing a mechanical mass-spring-damper system. In such cases, the electrical domain is translated into the mechanical domain for easier understanding.

The second, more significant reason is to analyze systems containing both mechanical and electrical components as a unified whole. This approach is especially beneficial in fields like mechatronics and robotics, where integration of mechanical and electrical elements is common. In these cases, the mechanical domain is often converted into the electrical domain because network analysis in the electrical domain is more advanced and highly developed.

=== The Maxwellian analogy ===
In the analogy developed by Maxwell, now known as the impedance analogy, voltage is analogous to force. The term "electromotive force" used for the voltage of an electric power source reflects this analogy. In this framework, current is analogous to velocity. Since the time derivative of displacement (distance) is equal to velocity and the time derivative of momentum equals force, quantities in other energy domains with similar differential relationships are referred to as generalized displacement, generalized velocity, generalized momentum, and generalized force. In the electrical domain, the generalized displacement is charge, which explains the Maxwellians' use of the term displacement.

Since elastance is defined as the ratio of voltage to charge, its analogue in other energy domains is the ratio of a generalized force to a generalized displacement. Therefore, elastance can be defined in any energy domain. The term elastance is used in the formal analysis of systems involving multiple energy domains, such as in bond graphs.

Definition of elastance in different energy domains
| Energy domain | Generalized force | Generalized displacement | Name for elastance |
|---|---|---|---|
| Electrical | Voltage | Charge | Elastance |
| Mechanical (translational) | Force | Displacement | Stiffness/elastance |
| Mechanical (rotational) | Torque | Angle | Rotational stiffness/elastance Moment of stiffness/elastance Torsional stiffness/elastance |
| Fluid | Pressure | Volume | Elastance |
| Thermal | Temperature difference | Entropy | Warming factor |
| Magnetic | Magnetomotive force (mmf) | Magnetic flux | Permeance |
| Chemical | Chemical potential | Molar amount | Inverse chemical capacitance |

=== Other analogies ===
Maxwell's analogy is not the only method for constructing analogies between mechanical and electrical systems. There are multiple ways to create such analogies. One commonly used system is the mobility analogy. In this analogy, force is mapped to current rather than voltage. As a result, electrical impedance no longer corresponds directly to mechanical impedance, and similarly, electrical elastance no longer corresponds to mechanical elastance.

== See also ==
- Compliance (physiology)
- Elasticity (physics)

== Bibliography ==
- Blake, F. C., "On electrostatic transformers and coupling coefficients", Journal of the American Institute of Electrical Engineers, vol. 40, no. 1, pp. 23–29, January 1921
- Borutzky, Wolfgang, Bond Graph Methodology, Springer, 2009 ISBN 1848828829.
- Busch-Vishniac, Ilene J., Electromechanical Sensors and Actuators, Springer Science & Business Media, 1999 ISBN 038798495X.
- Camara, John A., Electrical and Electronics Reference Manual for the Electrical and Computer PE Exam, Professional Publications, 2010 ISBN 159126166X.
- Cauer, E.; Mathis, W.; Pauli, R., "Life and Work of Wilhelm Cauer (1900 – 1945)", Proceedings of the Fourteenth International Symposium of Mathematical Theory of Networks and Systems (MTNS2000), Perpignan, June, 2000.
- Enderle, John; Bronzino, Joseph, Introduction to Biomedical Engineering, Academic Press, 2011 ISBN 0080961215.
- Fuchs, Hans U., The Dynamics of Heat: A Unified Approach to Thermodynamics and Heat Transfer, Springer Science & Business Media, 2010 ISBN 1441976043.
- Gupta, S. C., Thermodynamics, Pearson Education India, 2005 ISBN 813171795X.
- Heaviside, Oliver, Electromagnetic Theory: Volume I, Cosimo, 2007 ISBN 1602062714 (first published 1893).
- Hillert, Mats, Phase Equilibria, Phase Diagrams and Phase Transformations, Cambridge University Press, 2007 ISBN 1139465864.
- Horowitz, Isaac M., Synthesis of Feedback Systems, Elsevier, 2013 ISBN 1483267709.
- Howe, G. W. O., "The nomenclature of the fundamental concepts of electrical engineering", Journal of the Institution of Electrical Engineers, vol. 70, no. 420, pp. 54–61, December 1931.
- Jerrard, H. G., A Dictionary of Scientific Units, Springer, 2013 ISBN 9401705712.
- Kennelly, Arthur E.; Kurokawa, K., "Acoustic impedance and its measurement", Proceedings of the American Academy of Arts and Sciences, vol. 56, no. 1, pp. 3–42, 1921.
- Klein, H. Arthur, The Science of Measurement: A Historical Survey, Courier Corporation, 1974 ISBN 0486258394.
- Miles, Robert; Harrison, P.; Lippens, D., Terahertz Sources and Systems, Springer, 2012 ISBN 9401008248.
- Mills, Jeffrey P., Electro-magnetic Interference Reduction in Electronic Systems, PTR Prentice Hall, 1993 ISBN 0134639022.
- Mitchell, John Howard, Writing for Professional and Technical Journals, Wiley, 1968 OCLC 853309510
- Peek, Frank William, Dielectric Phenomena in High Voltage Engineering, Watchmaker Publishing, 1915 (reprint) ISBN 0972659668.
- Regtien, Paul P. L., Sensors for Mechatronics, Elsevier, 2012 ISBN 0123944090.
- van der Tweel, L. H.; Verburg, J., "Physical concepts", in Reneman, Robert S.; Strackee, J., Data in Medicine: Collection, Processing and Presentation, Springer Science & Business Media, 2012 ISBN 9400993099.
- Tschoegl, Nicholas W., The Phenomenological Theory of Linear Viscoelastic Behavior, Springer, 2012 ISBN 3642736025.
- Vieil, Eric, Understanding Physics and Physical Chemistry Using Formal Graphs, CRC Press, 2012 ISBN 1420086138
- Yavetz, Ido, From Obscurity to Enigma: The Work of Oliver Heaviside, 1872–1889, Springer, 2011 ISBN 3034801777.
