= Inerter (mechanical networks) =

Device in the study of mechanical networks in control theory

Inerter device being used to mechanically isolate vibration at a given frequency.

In the study of mechanical networks in control theory, an inerter is a two-terminal device in which the forces applied at the terminals are equal, opposite, and proportional to relative acceleration between the nodes. Under the intentionally misleading name of "J-damper" the concept has been used in Formula 1 racing car suspension systems.

It can be constructed with a flywheel mounted on a rack and pinion. It has a similar effect to increasing the inertia of the sprung object.

== Discovery ==
Malcolm C. Smith, a control engineering professor at the University of Cambridge, first introduced inerters in a 2002 paper. Smith extended the analogy between electrical and mechanical networks (the mobility analogy). He observed that the analogy was incomplete, since it was missing a mechanical device playing the same role as an electrical capacitor. The analogy makes mass the analog of capacitance, but the capacitor representing a mass always has one terminal connected to the equivalent of ground potential. In a real electrical network, capacitors can be connected between any two arbitrary potentials, they are not limited to ground. Noticing this, Smith set about finding a mechanical device that was a true analog of a capacitor. He found that he could construct such a device using gears and flywheels, one of several possible methods.

The constitutive equation is,

$$F=b(\dot{v}_2-\dot{v}_1)$$,

where the constant b is the inertance and has units of mass.

== Construction ==
A linear inerter can be constructed by meshing a flywheel with a rack gear. The pivot of the flywheel forms one terminal of the device, and the rack gear forms the other.

A rotational inerter can be constructed by meshing a flywheel with the ring gear of a differential. The side gears of the differential form the two terminals.

== Applications ==
Shortly after its discovery, the inerter principle was used under the intentionally misleading code name of J-damper in the suspension systems of Formula 1 racing cars. When tuned to the natural oscillation frequencies of the tires, the inerter reduced the mechanical load on the suspension. McLaren Mercedes began using a J-damper in early 2005, and Renault shortly thereafter. J-dampers were at the center of the 2007 Formula One espionage controversy which arose when Phil Mackereth left McLaren for Renault.

Researchers are developing new vibration-control devices based on inerters to build high-rise skyscrapers which can withstand high winds.

== See also ==
- Dashpot
- Hydraulic analogy
