= Functional analog =

Functional analog may refer to:

- Functional analog (chemistry), chemical compounds that have similar physical, chemical, biochemical, or pharmacological properties
- Functional analog (electronic), electronic entities that can be interchanged to fulfill the same function
