= Mechanical–electrical analogies =

Any analogy between electrical and mechanical systems, used for modelling

Mechanical–electrical analogies are the representation of mechanical systems as electrical networks. At first, such analogies were used in reverse to help explain electrical phenomena in familiar mechanical terms. James Clerk Maxwell introduced analogies of this sort in the 19th century. However, as electrical network analysis matured it was found that certain mechanical problems could more easily be solved through an electrical analogy. Theoretical developments in the electrical domain (Note: An energy domain pertains to a system or subsystem in which the energy and forces are all of a particular kind such as electrical, mechanical, acoustical, thermal, and so on.) that were particularly useful were the representation of an electrical network as an abstract topological diagram (the circuit diagram) using the lumped element model and the ability of network analysis to synthesise a network to meet a prescribed frequency function.

This approach is especially useful in the design of mechanical filters—these use mechanical devices to implement an electrical function. However, the technique can be used to solve purely mechanical problems, and can also be extended into other, unrelated energy domains. Nowadays, analysis by analogy is a standard design tool wherever more than one energy domain is involved. It has the major advantage that the entire system can be represented in a unified, coherent way. Electrical analogies are particularly used by transducer designers, by their nature they cross energy domains, and in control systems, whose sensors and actuators will typically be domain-crossing transducers. A given system being represented by an electrical analogy may conceivably have no electrical parts at all. For this reason domain-neutral terminology is preferred when developing network diagrams for control systems.

Mechanical–electrical analogies are developed by finding relationships between variables in one domain that have a mathematical form identical to variables in the other domain. There is no one, unique way of doing this; numerous analogies are theoretically possible, but there are two analogies that are widely used: the impedance analogy and the mobility analogy. The impedance analogy makes force and voltage analogous while the mobility analogy makes force and current analogous. By itself, that is not enough to fully define the analogy, a second variable must be chosen. A common choice is to make pairs of power conjugate variables analogous. These are variables which when multiplied together have units of power. In the impedance analogy, for instance, this results in force and velocity being analogous to voltage and current respectively.

Variations of these analogies are used for rotating mechanical systems, such as in electric motors. In the impedance analogy, instead of force, torque is made analogous to voltage. It is perfectly possible that both versions of the analogy are needed in, say, a system that includes rotating and reciprocating parts, in which case a force-torque analogy is required within the mechanical domain and a force-torque-voltage analogy to the electrical domain. Another variation is required for acoustical systems; here pressure and voltage are made analogous (impedance analogy). In the impedance analogy, the ratio of the power conjugate variables is always a quantity analogous to electrical impedance. For instance force/velocity is mechanical impedance. The mobility analogy does not preserve this analogy between impedances across domains, but it does have another advantage over the impedance analogy. In the mobility analogy the topology of networks is preserved, a mechanical network diagram has the same topology as its analogous electrical network diagram.

== Applications ==
Mechanical–electrical analogies are used to represent the function of a mechanical system as an equivalent electrical system by drawing analogies between mechanical and electrical parameters. A mechanical system by itself can be so represented, but analogies are of greatest use in electromechanical systems where there is a connection between mechanical and electrical parts. Analogies are especially useful in analysing mechanical filters. These are filters constructed of mechanical parts but designed to work in an electrical circuit through transducers. Circuit theory is well developed in the electrical domain in general and in particular there is a wealth of filter theory available. Mechanical systems can make use of this electrical theory in mechanical designs through a mechanical–electrical analogy.

Mechanical–electrical analogies are useful in general where the system includes transducers between different energy domains. Another area of application is the mechanical parts of acoustic systems such as the pickup and tonearm of record players. This was of some importance in early phonographs where the audio is transmitted from the pickup needle to the horn through various mechanical components entirely without electrical amplification. Early phonographs suffered badly from unwanted resonances in the mechanical parts. It was found that these could be eliminated by treating the mechanical parts as components of a low-pass filter which has the effect of flattening out the passband.

Electrical analogies of mechanical systems can be used just as a teaching aid, to help understand the behaviour of the mechanical system. In former times, up to about the early 20th century, it was more likely that the reverse analogy would be used; mechanical analogies were formed of the then little understood electrical phenomena.

== Forming an analogy ==
Electrical systems are commonly described by means of a circuit diagram. These are network diagrams that describe the topology of the electrical system using a specialised graph notation. The circuit diagram does not try to represent the true physical dimensions of the electrical components or their actual spatial relationship to each other. This is possible because the electrical components are represented as ideal lumped elements, that is, the element is treated as if it is occupying a single point (lumped at that point). Non-ideal components can be accommodated in this model by using more than one element to represent the component. For instance, a coil intended for use as an inductor has resistance as well as inductance. This can be represented on the circuit diagram as a resistor in series with an inductor. Thus, the first step in forming an analogy of a mechanical system is to describe it as a mechanical network in a similar way, that is, as a topological graph of ideal elements. Alternatively, more abstract representations to the circuit diagram are possible, for instance the bond graph.

A mechanical network diagram of a simple resonator (top) and one possible electrical analogy for it (bottom)

In an electrical network diagram, limited to linear systems, there are three passive elements: resistance, inductance, and capacitance; and two active elements: the voltage generator, and the current generator. (Note: The five-element scheme can be extended to active devices such as transistors by the use of two-port networks containing dependent generators provided the transistor is operating in a substantially linear region.) The mechanical analogs of these elements can be used to construct a mechanical network diagram. What the mechanical analogs of these elements are depends on what variables are chosen to be the fundamental variables. There is a wide choice of variables that can be used, but most commonly used are a power conjugate pair of variables (described below) and the pair of Hamiltonian variables derived from these.

There is a limit to the applicability of this lumped element model. The model works well if the components are small enough that the time taken for a wave to cross them is insignificant, or equivalently, if there is no significant phase difference in the wave either side of the component. What amounts to significant depends on how accurate the model is required to be, but a common rule of thumb is to require components to be smaller than one sixteenth of a wavelength. Since wavelength decreases with frequency, this puts an upper limit on the frequency that can be covered in this kind of design. This limit is much lower in the mechanical domain than the equivalent limit in the electrical domain. This is because the much higher propagation speeds in the electrical domain lead to longer wavelengths (mechanical vibrations in steel propagate at about 6,000 m/s, electromagnetic waves in common cable types propagate at about 2 × 10^{8} m/s). For instance, traditional mechanical filters are only made up to around 600 kHz (although MEMS devices can operate at much higher frequencies due to their very small size). In the electrical domain, on the other hand, the transition from the lumped element model to the distributed element model occurs in the hundreds of megahertz region.

In some cases it is possible to continue using a topological network diagram even when components needing a distributed element analysis are present. In the electrical domain, a transmission line, a basic distributed element component, can be included in the model with the introduction of the additional element of electrical length. The transmission line is a special case because it is invariant along its length and hence the full geometry need not be modelled. Another way of dealing with distributed elements is to use a finite element analysis whereby the distributed element is approximated by a large number of small lumped elements. Just such an approach was used in one paper to model the cochlea of the human ear. Another condition required of electrical systems for the application of the lumped element model is that no significant fields exist outside the component since these can couple to other unrelated components. However, these effects can often be modelled by introducing some virtual lumped elements called strays or parasitics. An analog of this in mechanical systems is vibration in one component being coupled to an unrelated component.

=== Power conjugate variables ===
The power conjugate variables are a pair of variables whose product is power. In the electrical domain the power conjugate variables chosen are invariably voltage (v) and current (i). Thus, the power conjugate variables in the mechanical domain are analogs. However, this is not enough to make the choice of mechanical fundamental variables unique. The usual choice for a translational mechanical system is force (F) and velocity (u) but it is not the only choice. A different pair may be more appropriate for a system with a different geometry, such as a rotational system.

Even after the mechanical fundamental variables have been chosen, there is still not a unique set of analogs. There are two ways that the two pairs of power conjugate variables can be associated with each other in the analogy. For instance the associations F with v and u with i can be made. However, the alternative associations u with v and F with i are also possible. This leads to two classes of analogies, the impedance analogies and the mobility analogies. These analogies are the dual of each other. The same mechanical network has analogs in two different electrical networks. These two electrical networks are the dual circuits of each other.

=== Hamiltonian variables ===
The Hamiltonian variables, also called the energy variables, are those variables r = (q, p) which are conjugate according to Hamilton's equations:

$\frac{\mathrm{d}\boldsymbol{p}}{\mathrm{d}t} = -\frac{\partial \mathcal{H}}{\partial \boldsymbol{q}}\;,\quad\quad \frac{\mathrm{d}\boldsymbol{q}}{\mathrm{d}t} = \frac{\partial \mathcal{H}}{\partial \boldsymbol{p}}$

Further, the time derivatives of the Hamiltonian variables are the power conjugate variables.

The Hamiltonian variables in the electrical domain are charge (q) and flux linkage (λ) because

$\frac{\partial \mathcal{H}}{\partial q} = -\frac {d \lambda}{dt} = v$ (Faraday's law of induction) and $\frac{\partial \mathcal{H}}{\partial \lambda} = \frac {dq}{dt} = i$

In the translational mechanical domain the Hamiltonian variables are distance displacement (x) and momentum (p) because

$\frac{\partial \mathcal{H}}{\partial x} = -\frac {dp}{dt} = F$ (Newton's second law of motion) and $\frac{\partial \mathcal{H}}{\partial p} = \frac {dx}{dt} = u$

There is a corresponding relationship for other analogies and sets of variables. The Hamiltonian variables are also called the energy variables. The integrand of a power conjugate variable with respect to a Hamiltonian variable is a measure of energy. For instance,

$\int F\,dx$ and $\int u\,dp$

are both expressions of energy. They can also be called generalised momentum and generalised displacement after their analogs in the mechanical domain. Some authors discourage this terminology because it is not domain neutral. Likewise, the use of the terms I-type and V-type (after current and voltage) is also discouraged.

== Classes of analogy ==
There are two principal classes of analogy in use. The impedance analogy (also called the Maxwell analogy) preserves the analogy between mechanical, acoustical and electrical impedance but does not preserve the topology of networks. The mechanical network is arranged differently to its analogous electrical network. The mobility analogy (also called the Firestone analogy) preserves network topologies at the expense of losing the analogy between impedances across energy domains. There is also the through and across analogy, also called the Trent analogy. The through and across analogy between the electrical and mechanical domain is the same as in the mobility analogy. However, the analogy between the electrical and acoustical domains is like the impedance analogy. Analogies between the mechanical and acoustical domain in the through and across analogy have a dual relationship with both the impedance analogy and mobility analogy.

Different fundamental variables are chosen for mechanical translation and rotational systems leading to two variants for each of the analogies. For instance, linear distance is the displacement variable in a translational system, but this is not so appropriate for rotating systems where angle is used instead. Acoustical analogies have also been included in the descriptions as a third variant. While acoustical energy is ultimately mechanical in nature, it is treated in the literature as an instance of a different energy domain, the fluid domain, and has different fundamental variables. Analogies between all three domains − electrical, mechanical and acoustical − are required to fully represent electromechanical audio systems.

=== Impedance analogies ===
Impedance analogies, also called the Maxwell analogy, classify the two variables making up the power conjugate pair as an effort variable and a flow variable. The effort variable in an energy domain is the variable analogous to force in the mechanical domain. The flow variable in an energy domain is the variable analogous to velocity in the mechanical domain. Power conjugate variables in the analog domain are chosen that bear some resemblance to force and velocity.

In the electrical domain, the effort variable is voltage and the flow variable is electrical current. The ratio of voltage to current is electrical resistance (Ohm's law). The ratio of the effort variable to the flow variable in other domains is also described as resistance. Oscillating voltages and currents give rise to the concept of electrical impedance when there is a phase difference between them. Impedance can be thought of as an extension to the concept of resistance. Resistance is associated with energy dissipation. Impedance encompasses energy storage as well as energy dissipation.

The impedance analogy gives rise to the concept of impedance in other energy domains (but measured in different units). The translational impedance analogy describes mechanical systems moving in a single linear dimension and gives rise to the idea of mechanical impedance. The unit of mechanical impedance is the mechanical ohm; in SI units this is N-s/m, or Kg/s. The rotational impedance analogy describes rotating mechanical systems and gives rise to the idea of rotational impedance. The unit of rotational impedance in the SI system is N-m-s/rad. The acoustical impedance analogy gives rise to the idea of acoustic impedance. The unit of acoustic impedance is the acoustic ohm; in SI units this is N-s/m^{5}.

Variables
Type		Mechanical translation variable	Mechanical rotation variable	Acoustical variable	Analogous electrical variable
Power conjugate pair	Effort variable	Force	Torque	Pressure	Voltage
Power conjugate pair	Flow variable	Velocity	Angular velocity	Volume flow rate	Current
Hamiltonian variables	Effort Hamiltonian	Momentum	Angular momentum	Pressure-momentum	Flux linkage
Hamiltonian variables	Flow Hamiltonian	Displacement	Angle	Volume	Charge
Elements		Damping	Rotational resistance	Acoustic resistance	Resistance
Elements		Mass	Moment of inertia	Acoustic mass (Note: Acoustic mass does not have units of mass. In the SI system it has units of kg/m^{4} (Barron, p. 333))	Inductance
Elements		Compliance	Rotational compliance	Acoustic compliance	Capacitance
Elements		Mechanical impedance	Mechanical impedance	Acoustic impedance	Electrical impedance

=== Mobility analogies ===
Mobility analogies, also called the Firestone analogy, are the electrical duals of impedance analogies. That is, the effort variable in the mechanical domain is analogous to current (the flow variable) in the electrical domain, and the flow variable in the mechanical domain is analogous to voltage (the effort variable) in the electrical domain. The electrical network representing the mechanical system is the dual network of that in the impedance analogy.

The mobility analogy is characterised by admittance in the same way that the impedance analogy is characterised by impedance. Admittance is the algebraic inverse of impedance. In the mechanical domain, mechanical admittance is more usually called mobility.

Variables
Type		Mechanical translation variable	Mechanical rotation variable	Acoustical variable	Analogous electrical variable
Power conjugate pair	Effort variable	Force	Torque	Pressure	Current
Power conjugate pair	Flow variable	Velocity	Angular velocity	Volume flow rate	Voltage
Hamiltonian variables	Effort Hamiltonian	Momentum	Angular momentum	Pressure-momentum	Charge
Hamiltonian variables	Flow Hamiltonian	Displacement	Angle	Volume	Flux linkage
Elements		Responsiveness (Note: Responsiveness is the inverse of mechanical resistance (Seely et al., p. 200))	Rotational responsiveness	Acoustic conductance	Resistance
Elements		Mass	Moment of inertia	Acoustic mass	Capacitance
Elements		Compliance	Rotational compliance	Acoustic compliance	Inductance
Elements		Mobility	Rotational mobility	Acoustic admittance	Electrical impedance

=== Through and across analogies ===
Through and across analogies, also called the Trent analogy, classify the two variables making up the power conjugate pair as an across variable and a through variable. The across variable is a variable that appears across the two terminals of an element. The across variable is measured relative to the element terminals. The through variable is a variable that passes through, or acts through an element, that is, it has the same value at both terminals of the element. The benefit of the through and across analogy is that when the through Hamiltonian variable is chosen to be a conserved quantity, Kirchhoff's node rule can be used, and the model will have the same topology as the real system.

Thus, in the electrical domain the across variable is voltage and the through variable is current. In the mechanical domain the analogous variables are velocity and force, as in the mobility analogy. In the acoustic system, pressure is an across variable because pressure is measured relative to the two terminals of an element, not as an absolute pressure. It is thus not analogous to force which is a through variable, even though pressure is in units of force per area. Forces act through an element; a rod with a force applied to the top will transmit the same force to an element connected to its bottom. Thus, in the through and across analogy the mechanical domain is analogous to the electrical domain like the mobility analogy, but the acoustical domain is analogous to the electrical domain like the impedance analogy.

Variables
Type		Mechanical translation variable	Mechanical rotation variable	Acoustical variable	Analogous electrical variable
Power conjugate pair	Across variable	Velocity	Angular velocity	Pressure	Voltage
Power conjugate pair	Through variable	Force	Torque	Volume flow rate	Current
Hamiltonian variables	Across Hamiltonian	Displacement	Angle	Pressure-momentum	Flux linkage
Hamiltonian variables	Through Hamiltonian	Linear momentum	Angular momentum	Volume	Charge

=== Other energy domains ===
The electrical analogy can be extended to many other energy domains. In the field of sensors and actuators, and for control systems using them, it is a common method of analysis to develop an electrical analogy of the entire system. Since sensors can be sensing a variable in any energy domain, and likewise outputs from the system can be in any energy domain, analogies for all energy domains are required. The following table gives a summary of the most common power conjugate variables used to form analogies.

Energy domain analogies
Energy domain	Effort variable	Flow variable
Electrical	Voltage	Current
Mechanical	Force	Velocity
Fluid	Pressure	Volume flow rate
Thermal	Temperature difference	Entropy flow rate
Magnetic	Magnetomotive force (mmf)	Magnetic flux rate of change
Chemical	Chemical potential	Molar flow rate

It is perhaps more common in the thermal domain to choose temperature and thermal power as the fundamental variables because, unlike entropy, they can be measured directly. The concept of thermal resistance is based on this analogy. However, these are not power conjugate variables and are not fully compatible with the other variables in the table. An integrated electrical analogy across multiple domains that includes this thermal analogy will not correctly model energy flows.

Similarly, the commonly seen analogy using mmf and magnetic flux as the fundamental variables, which gives rise to the concept of magnetic reluctance, does not correctly model energy flow. The variable pair mmf and magnetic flux is not a power conjugate pair. This reluctance model is sometimes called the reluctance-resistance model since it makes these two quantities analogous. The analogy shown in the table, which does use a power conjugate pair, is sometimes called the gyrator–capacitor model.

== Transducers ==
A transducer is a device that takes energy from one domain as input and converts it to another energy domain as output. They are often reversible, but are rarely used in that way. Transducers have many uses and there are many kinds, in electromechanical systems they can be used as actuators and sensors. In audio electronics they provide the conversion between the electrical and acoustical domains. The transducer provides the link between the mechanical and electrical domains and thus a network representation is required for it in order to develop a unified electrical analogy. To do this the concept of port from the electrical domain is extended into other domains.

Transducers have (at least (Note: Piezoelectric transducers are frequently modelled as three-port devices, one electrical and two mechanical, because mechanical vibrations are induced on both sides of the crystal (Cheeke, pp. 213-214).)) two ports, one port in the mechanical domain and one in the electrical domain, and are analogous to electrical two-port networks. This is to be compared to the elements discussed so far which are all one-ports. Two-port networks can be represented as a 2×2 matrix, or equivalently, as a network of two dependent generators and two impedances or admittances. There are six canonical forms of these representations: impedance parameters, chain parameters, hybrid parameters and their inverses. Any of them can be used. However, the representation of a passive transducer converting between analogous variables (for instance an effort variable to another effort variable in the impedance analogy) can be simplified by replacing the dependent generators with a transformer.

On the other hand, a transducer converting non-analogous power conjugate variables cannot be represented by a transformer. The two-port element in the electrical domain that does this is called a gyrator. This device converts voltages to currents and currents to voltages. By analogy, a transducer that converts non-analogous variables between energy domains is also called a gyrator. For instance, electromagnetic transducers convert current to force and velocity to voltage. In the impedance analogy such a transducer is a gyrator. Whether a transducer is a gyrator or a transformer is analogy related; the same electromagnetic transducer in the mobility analogy is a transformer because it is converting between analogous variables.

== History ==
James Clerk Maxwell developed very detailed mechanical analogies of electrical phenomena. He was the first to associate force with voltage (1873) and consequently is usually credited with founding the impedance analogy. This was the earliest mechanical–electrical analogy. However, the term impedance was not coined until 1886, long after Maxwell's death, by Oliver Heaviside. The idea of complex impedance was introduced by Arthur E. Kennelly in 1893, and the concept of impedance was not extended into the mechanical domain until 1920 by Kennelly and Arthur Gordon Webster.

Maxwell's purpose in constructing this analogy was not to represent mechanical systems in terms of electrical networks. Rather, it was to explain electrical phenomena in more familiar mechanical terms. When George Ashley Campbell first demonstrated the use of loading coils to improve telephone lines in 1899, he calculated the distance needed between coils by analogy with the work of Charles Godfrey on mechanical lines loaded with periodic weights. As electrical phenomena became better understood the reverse of this analogy, using electrical analogies to explain mechanical systems, started to become more common. Indeed, the lumped element abstract topology of electrical analysis has much to offer problems in the mechanical domain, and other energy domains for that matter. By 1900 the electrical analogy of the mechanical domain was becoming commonplace. From about 1920 the electrical analogy became a standard analysis tool. Vannevar Bush was a pioneer of this kind of modelling in his development of analogue computers, and a coherent presentation of this method was presented in a 1925 paper by Clifford A. Nickle.

The application of electrical network analysis, most especially the newly developed field of filter theory, to mechanical and acoustic systems led to huge improvements in performance. According to Warren P. Mason the efficiency of ship electric foghorns grew from less than one per cent to 50 per cent. The bandwidth of mechanical phonographs grew from three to five octaves when the mechanical parts of the sound transmission were designed as if they were the elements of an electric filter (see also Mechanical filter § Sound reproduction). Remarkably, the conversion efficiency was improved at the same time (the usual situation with amplifying systems is that gain can be traded for bandwidth such that the gain-bandwidth product remains constant).

In 1933 Floyd A. Firestone proposed a new analogy, the mobility analogy, in which force is analogous to current instead of voltage. Firestone introduced the concept of across and through variables in this paper and presented a structure for extending the analogy into other energy domains. A variation of the force-current analogy was proposed by Horace M. Trent in 1955 and it is this version that is generally meant by the through and across analogy. Trent used a linear graph method of representing networks which has resulted in the force-current analogy historically being associated with linear graphs. The force-voltage analogy is historically used with bond graph representations, introduced in 1960 by Henry Paynter, however, it is possible to use either analogy with either representation if desired.

== Physical implementations ==
One of the main purposes of the mechanical-electrical analogy is to make an abstract topic more tangible, so there are physical implementations of a mechanical-electrical analogy. One mechanical system that provides a close analog to a wide range of electrical circuits is the Spintronics toy.

The mechanical equivalent of an electronic oscillator circuit made using spintronic parts.

A spintronic ammeter. The pitch and volume of the sound it produces indicates the magnitude of current flow.

A spintronic 6 V battery. The battery puts a constant force (i.e., voltage) on the chain.

A spintronic 1 mF capacitor and voltmeter. A torsion spring on the inside stores energy when the sprockets on the body are turned.

A spintronic 55 H inductor. The spintronic inductor has three heavy weights attached to the outside of rotating sprockets. This makes the current change slowly when the voltage applied to it is changed abruptly.

A spintronic junction is the equivalent to an electrical junction (node) of three wires. Each sprocket behaves as one of the three wires. Despite the difference in diameter among the three sprockets, the planetary gear system makes them all behave equally.

The three spintronic resistors each have different equivalent values (from left to right): 1000 ohms, 500 ohms, and 200 ohms.

A spintronic equivalent of an enhancement-mode field-effect transistor. The greater the voltage applied to the top sprocket, the lower the resistance of the bottom sprocket.

This spintronic switch is a mechanical equivalent of a single-pole single-throw (SPST) toggle switch.

== See also ==
- Analogical models
- Elastance contains information on Oliver Heaviside's role in analogies
- Teledeltos
- Hydraulic analogy

== Bibliography ==
- Agarwal, Anant; Lang, Jeffrey, Foundations of Analog and Digital Electronic Circuits, Morgan Kaufmann, 2005 ISBN 008050681X.
- Barron, Randall F., Industrial Noise Control and Acoustics, CRC Press, 2002 ISBN 0203910087.
- Beranek, Leo Leroy; Mellow, Tim J., Acoustics: Sound Fields and Transducers, Academic Press, 2012 ISBN 0123914213.
- Bishop, Robert H., Mechatronics: An Introduction, CRC Press, 2005 ISBN 1420037242.
- Borutzky, Wolfgang, Bond Graph Methodology, Springer, 2009 ISBN 1848828829.
- Busch-Vishniac, Ilene J., Electromechanical Sensors and Actuators, Springer Science & Business Media, 1999 ISBN 038798495X.
- Care, Charles, Technology for Modelling: Electrical Analogies, Engineering Practice, and the Development of Analogue Computing, Springer, 2010 ISBN 1848829485.
- Carr, Joseph J. RF Components and Circuits, Oxford: Newnes, 2002 ISBN 0750648449.
- Chan, Shu-Park, "Circuits: Introduction", pp. 2–4, in Dorf, Richard C. (ed), The Electrical Engineering Handbook, CRC Press, 1997 ISBN 1420049763.
- Cheeke, David N., Fundamentals and Applications of Ultrasonic Waves, CRC Press, 2012 ISBN 143985498X.
- Darlington, S, "A history of network synthesis and filter theory for circuits composed of resistors, inductors, and capacitors", IEEE Transactions on Circuits and Systems, vol. 31, pp. 3–13, 1984.
- de Silva, Clarence W., Vibration: Fundamentals and Practice, CRC Press, 2006 ISBN 0849319870.
- Eargle, John, Loudspeaker Handbook, Kluwer Academic Publishers, 2003 ISBN 1402075847.
- Ferrell, Enoch B. (October 1946). "Electrical and Mechanical Analogies" (PDF). Bell Laboratories Record. XXIV (X). Switching Development Department, Bell Laboratories, USA: 372–373. Archived (PDF) from the original on 2023-02-23. (2 pages)
- Firestone, Floyd A., "A new analogy between mechanical and electrical system elements", The Journal of the Acoustical Society of America, vol. 3, pp. 249–267, 1933.
- Froehlich, Fritz E.; Kent, Allen, The Froehlich/Kent Encyclopedia of Telecommunications, CRC Press, 1991 ISBN 0824729021.
- Fukazawa, Tatsuya; Tanaka, Yasuo, "Evoked otoacoustic emissions in a cochlear model", pp. 191–196 in Hohmann, D. (ed), ECoG, OAE and Intraoperative Monitoring: Proceedings of the First International Conference, Würzburg, Germany, September 20–24, 1992, Kugler Publications, 1993 ISBN 9062990975.
- Hamill, David C., "Lumped equivalent circuits of magnetic components: the gyrator-capacitor approach", IEEE Transactions on Power Electronics, vol. 8, iss. 2, pp. 97–103.
- Hunt, Frederick V., Electroacoustics: the Analysis of Transduction, and its Historical Background, Harvard University Press, 1954 OCLC 2042530.
- Jackson, Roger G., Novel Sensors and Sensing, CRC Press, 2004 ISBN 1420033808.
- Janschek, Klaus, Mechatronic Systems Design, Springer, 2011 ISBN 3642175317.
- Joines, William T.; Palmer, W. Devereux; Bernhard, Jennifer T., Microwave Transmission Line Circuits, Artech House, 2013 ISBN 1608075699.
- Kleiner, Mendel, Electroacoustics, CRC Press, 2013 ISBN 1439836183.
- Lenk, Arno; G. Ballas, Rüdiger; Werthschützky, Roland; Pfeifer, Günther, Electromechanical Systems in Microtechnology and Mechatronics, Springer, 2010 ISBN 3642108067.
- Lurie, Boris; Enright, Paul, Classical Feedback Control, CRC Press, 2011 ISBN 1439860173.
- Martinsen, Orjan G.; Grimnes, Sverre, Bioimpedance and Bioelectricity Basics, Academic Press, 2011 ISBN 0080568807.
- Mason, Warren P., "Electrical and mechanical analogies", Bell System Technical Journal, vol. 20, no. 4, pp. 405–414, October 1941.
- Myers, Rusty L., The Basics of Physics, Greenwood Publishing Group, 2006 ISBN 0313328579.
- Paynter, Henry M., Analysis and Design of Engineering Systems, MIT Press, 1961 OCLC 1670711.
- Radmanesh, Matthew M., Electronic Waves & Transmission Line Circuit Design, Author House, 2011 ISBN 1456752324.
- Regtien, Paul P. L., Sensors for Mechatronics, Elsevier, 2012 ISBN 0123944090.
- Seely, Samuel; Tarnoff, Norman H.; Holstein, David, Digital Computers in Engineering, Holt, Rinehart and Winston, 1970 OCLC 92614.
- Semmlow, John, Signals and Systems for Bioengineers, Academic Press, 2012 ISBN 0123849829.
- Sen, S. N., Acoustics, Waves and Oscillations, New Age International, 1990 ISBN 8122402666.
- Smith, Malcolm C., "Synthesis of mechanical networks: the inerter", IEEE Transactions on Automatic Control, vol. 47, iss. 10, pp. 1648–1662, October 2002.
- Trent, Horace M., "Isomorphisms between oriented linear graphs and lumped physical systems", The Journal of the Acoustical Society of America, vol. 27, pp. 500–526, 1955.
- White, Curt, Data Communications and Computer Networks, Cengage Learning, 2012 ISBN 1285225864.
