= Mechanical filter =

Type of signal processing filter

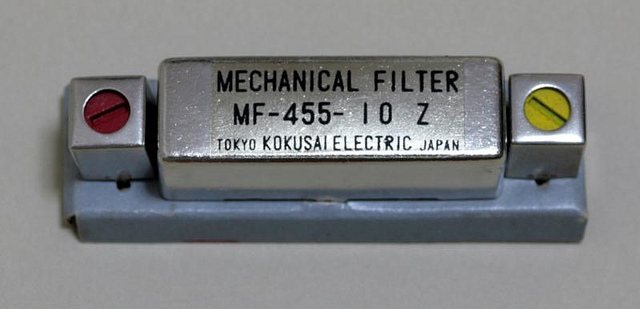
Figure 1. A mechanical filter made by the Kokusai Electric Company intended for selecting the narrow 2 kHz bandwidth signals in SSB radio receivers. It operates at 455 kHz, a common IF for these receivers, and is dimensioned 45 mm × 15 mm × 15 mm (1.77 in × 0.59 in × 0.59 in).

A mechanical filter is a signal processing filter usually used in place of an electronic filter at radio frequencies. Its purpose is the same as that of a normal electronic filter: to pass a range of signal frequencies, but to block others. The filter acts on mechanical vibrations which are the analogue of the electrical signal. At the input and output of the filter, transducers convert the electrical signal into, and then back from, these mechanical vibrations.

The components of a mechanical filter are all directly analogous to the various elements found in electrical circuits. The mechanical elements obey mathematical functions which are identical to their corresponding electrical elements. This makes it possible to apply electrical network analysis and filter design methods to mechanical filters. Electrical theory has developed a large library of mathematical forms that produce useful filter frequency responses and the mechanical filter designer is able to make direct use of these. It is only necessary to set the mechanical components to appropriate values to produce a filter with an identical response to the electrical counterpart.

Steel alloys and iron–nickel alloys are common materials for mechanical filter components; nickel is sometimes used for the input and output couplings. Resonators in the filter made from these materials need to be machined to precisely adjust their resonance frequency before final assembly.

While the meaning of mechanical filter in this article is one that is used in an electromechanical role, it is possible to use a mechanical design to filter mechanical vibrations or sound waves (which are also essentially mechanical) directly. For example, filtering of audio frequency response in the design of loudspeaker cabinets can be achieved with mechanical components. In the electrical application, in addition to mechanical components which correspond to their electrical counterparts, transducers are needed to convert between the mechanical and electrical domains. A representative selection of the wide variety of component forms and topologies for mechanical filters are presented in this article.

The theory of mechanical filters was first applied to improving the mechanical parts of phonographs in the 1920s. By the 1950s mechanical filters were being manufactured as self-contained components for applications in radio transmitters and high-end receivers. The high "quality factor", Q, that mechanical resonators can attain, far higher than that of an all-electrical LC circuit, made possible the construction of mechanical filters with excellent selectivity. Good selectivity, being important in radio receivers, made such filters highly attractive. Contemporary researchers are working on microelectromechanical filters, the mechanical devices corresponding to electronic integrated circuits.

== Elements ==
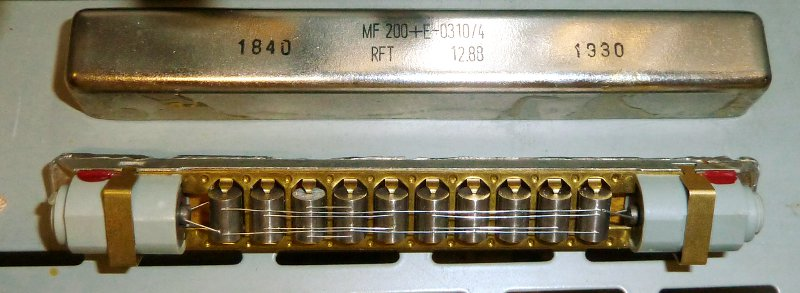
Mechanical filter from a telephone carrier system using torsional resonator elements

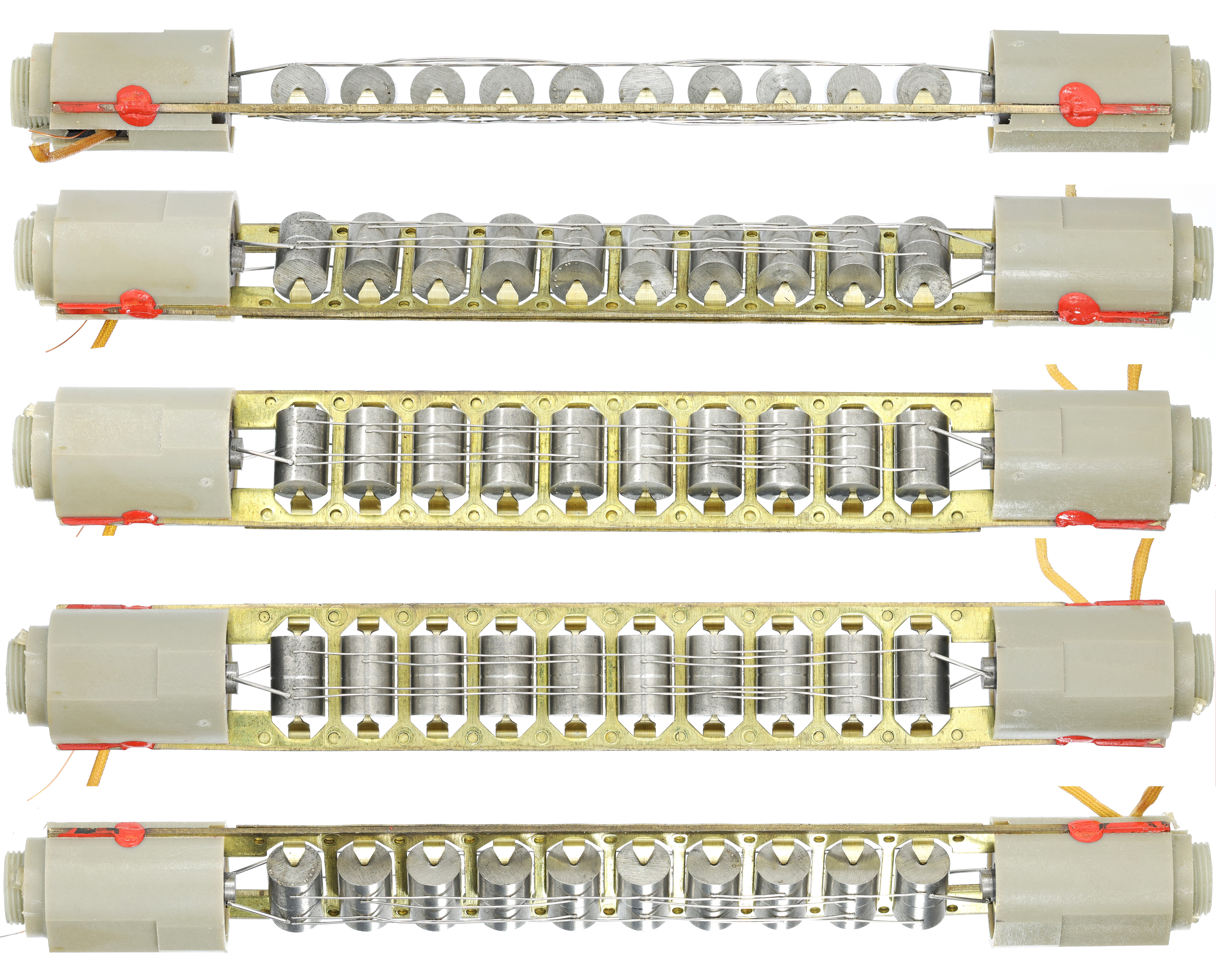
Details of a mechanical filter using torsional resonator elements

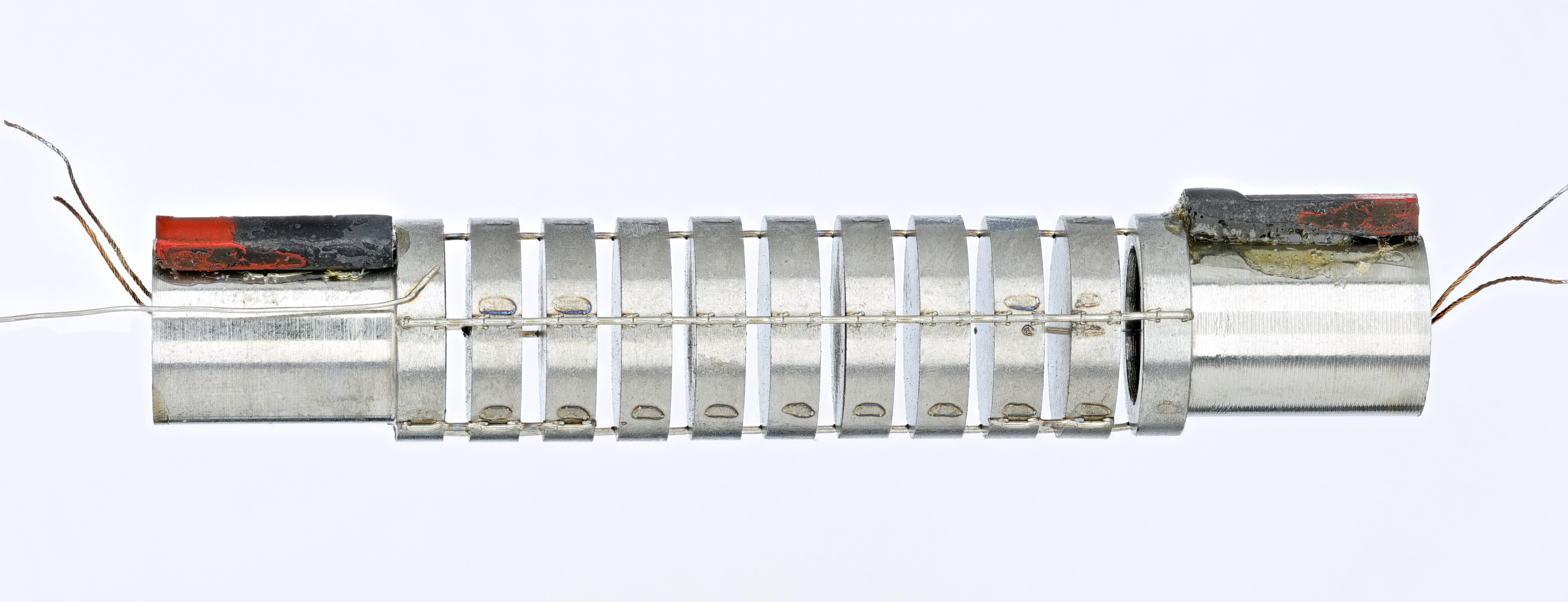
Details of a mechanical filter using disc flexural resonators

The elements of a passive linear electrical network consist of inductors, capacitors and resistors which have the properties of inductance, elastance (inverse capacitance) and resistance, respectively. The mechanical counterparts of these properties are, respectively, mass, stiffness and damping. In most electronic filter designs, only inductor and capacitor elements are used in the body of the filter (although the filter may be terminated with resistors at the input and output). Resistances are not present in a theoretical filter composed of ideal components and only arise in practical designs as unwanted parasitic elements. Likewise, a mechanical filter would ideally consist only of components with the properties of mass and stiffness, but in reality some damping is present as well.

The mechanical counterparts of voltage and electric current in this type of analysis are, respectively, force (F) and velocity (v) and represent the signal waveforms. From this, a mechanical impedance can be defined in terms of the imaginary angular frequency, jω, which entirely follows the electrical analogy.

Mechanical element	Formula (in one dimension)	Mechanical impedance	Electrical counterpart
Stiffness, S	$S = {F \over x}$	$Z={S \over j\omega}$	Elastance, 1/C, the reciprocal of capacitance
Mass, M	$M = \frac{F}{dv/dt} = {F \over a}$	$Z=j\omega M \,$	Inductance, L
Damping, D	$D = {F \over v}$	$Z = D \,$	Resistance, R

Notes:
The symbols x, t, and a represent their usual quantities; distance, time, and acceleration respectively.
The mechanical quantity compliance, which is the reciprocal of stiffness, can be used instead of stiffness to give a more direct correspondence to capacitance, but stiffness is used in the table as the more familiar quantity.

The scheme presented in the table is known as the impedance analogy. Circuit diagrams produced using this analogy match the electrical impedance of the mechanical system seen by the electrical circuit, making it intuitive from an electrical engineering standpoint. There is also the mobility analogy, (Note: The impedance analogy is the more common approach, but amongst those using the mobility analogy is Rockwell Collins Inc, a principal manufacturer of mechanical filters.) in which force corresponds to current and velocity corresponds to voltage. This has equally valid results but requires using the reciprocals of the electrical counterparts listed above. Hence, M → C , S → 1/L , D → G where G is electrical conductance (the reciprocal of resistance, if there is no reactance). Equivalent circuits produced by this scheme are similar, but are the dual impedance forms whereby series elements become parallel, capacitors become inductors, and so on. Circuit diagrams using the mobility analogy more closely match the mechanical arrangement of the circuit, making it more intuitive from a mechanical engineering standpoint. In addition to their application to electromechanical systems, these analogies are widely used to aid analysis in acoustics.

Any mechanical component will unavoidably possess both mass and stiffness. This translates in electrical terms to an LC circuit, that is, a circuit consisting of an inductor and a capacitor, hence mechanical components are resonators and are often used as such. It is still possible to represent inductors and capacitors as individual lumped elements in a mechanical implementation by minimising (but never quite eliminating) the unwanted property. Capacitors may be made of thin, long rods, that is, the mass is minimised and the compliance is maximised. Inductors, on the other hand, may be made of short, wide pieces which maximise the mass in comparison to the compliance of the piece.

Mechanical parts act as a transmission line for mechanical vibrations. If the wavelength is short in comparison to the part then a lumped-element model as described above is no longer adequate and a distributed-element model must be used instead. The mechanical distributed elements are entirely analogous to electrical distributed elements and the mechanical filter designer can use the methods of electrical distributed-element filter design.

== History ==
=== Harmonic telegraph ===
Mechanical filter design was developed by applying the discoveries made in electrical filter theory to mechanics. However, a very early example (1870s) of acoustic filtering was the "harmonic telegraph", which arose precisely because electrical resonance was poorly understood but mechanical resonance (in particular, acoustic resonance) was very familiar to engineers. This situation was not to last for long; electrical resonance had been known to science for some time before this, and it was not long before engineers started to produce all-electric designs for filters. In its time, though, the harmonic telegraph was of some importance. The idea was to combine several telegraph signals on one telegraph line by what would now be called frequency division multiplexing thus saving enormously on line installation costs. The key of each operator activated a vibrating electromechanical reed which converted this vibration into an electrical signal. Filtering at the receiving operator was achieved by a similar reed tuned to precisely the same frequency, which would only vibrate and produce a sound from transmissions by the operator with the identical tuning.

Versions of the harmonic telegraph were developed by Elisha Gray, Alexander Graham Bell, Ernest Mercadier (Note: in French Wikipedia.) and others. Its ability to act as a sound transducer to and from the electrical domain was to inspire the invention of the telephone.

=== Mechanical equivalent circuits ===
Once the basics of electrical network analysis began to be established, it was not long before the ideas of complex impedance and filter design theories were carried over into mechanics by analogy. Kennelly, who was also responsible for introducing complex impedance, and Webster were the first to extend the concept of impedance into mechanical systems in 1920. Mechanical admittance and the associated mobility analogy came much later and are due to Firestone in 1932.

It was not enough to just develop a mechanical analogy. This could be applied to problems that were entirely in the mechanical domain, but for mechanical filters with an electrical application it is necessary to include the transducer in the analogy as well. Poincaré (1907) was the first to describe a transducer as a pair of linear algebraic equations relating electrical variables (voltage and current) to mechanical variables (force and velocity). These equations can be expressed as a matrix relationship in much the same way as the z-parameters of a two-port network in electrical theory, to which this is entirely analogous:

$$\begin{bmatrix} V \\ F \end{bmatrix} = \begin{bmatrix} z_{11} & z_{12} \\ z_{21} & z_{22} \end{bmatrix} \begin{bmatrix} I \\ v \end{bmatrix}$$

where V and I represent the voltage and current respectively on the electrical side of the transducer.

Wegel, in 1921, was the first to express these equations in terms of mechanical impedance as well as electrical impedance. The element $\ z_{22}\$ is the open circuit mechanical impedance, that is, the impedance presented by the mechanical side of the transducer when no current is entering the electrical side. The element $\ z_{11}\$, conversely, is the clamped electrical impedance, that is, the impedance presented to the electrical side when the mechanical side is clamped and prevented from moving (velocity is zero). The remaining two elements, $\ z_{21}\$ and $\ z_{12}\ ,$ describe the transducer forward and reverse transfer functions respectively. Once these ideas were in place, engineers were able to extend electrical theory into the mechanical domain and analyse an electromechanical system as a unified whole.

=== Sound reproduction ===
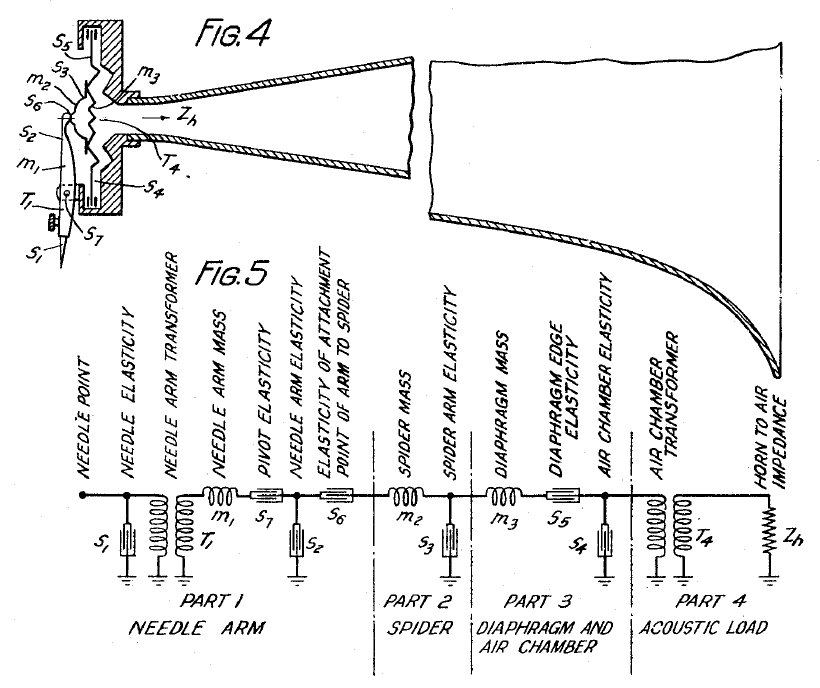
Figure 2. Harrison's phonograph mechanism and its electrical equivalent circuit.

An early application of these new theoretical tools was in phonographic sound reproduction. A recurring problem with early phonograph designs was that mechanical resonances in the pickup and sound transmission mechanism caused excessively large peaks and troughs in the frequency response, resulting in poor sound quality. In 1923, Harrison of the Western Electric Company filed a patent for a phonograph in which the mechanical design was entirely represented as an electrical circuit. The horn of the phonograph is represented as a transmission line, and is a resistive load for the rest of the circuit, while all the mechanical and acoustic parts—from the pickup needle through to the horn—are translated into lumped components according to the impedance analogy. The circuit arrived at is a ladder topology of series resonant circuits coupled by shunt capacitors. This can be viewed as a bandpass filter circuit. Harrison designed the component values of this filter to have a specific passband corresponding to the desired audio passband (in this case 100 Hz to 6 kHz) and a flat response. Translating these electrical element values back into mechanical quantities provided specifications for the mechanical components in terms of mass and stiffness, which in turn could be translated into physical dimensions for their manufacture. The resulting phonograph has a flat frequency response in its passband and is free of the resonances previously experienced. Shortly after this, Harrison filed another patent using the same methodology on telephone transmit and receive transducers.

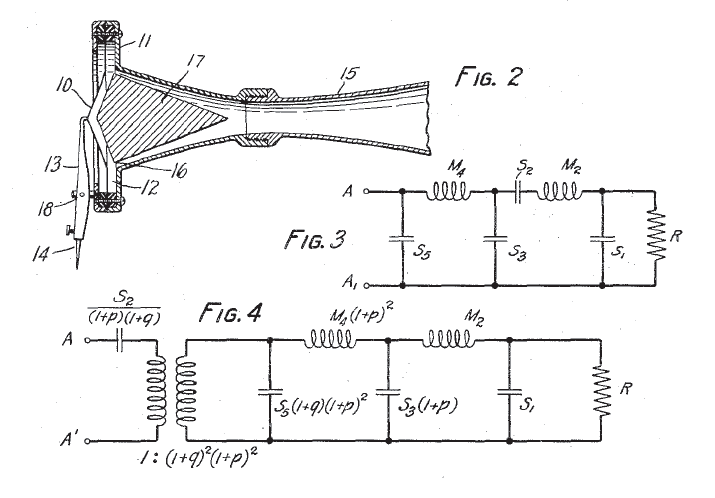
Figure 3. Norton's mechanical filter together with its electrical equivalent circuit.

Harrison used Campbell's image filter theory, which was the most advanced filter theory available at the time. In this theory, filter design is viewed essentially as an impedance matching problem. More advanced filter theory was brought to bear on this problem by Norton in 1929 at Bell Labs. Norton followed the same general approach though he later described to Darlington the filter he designed as being "maximally flat". Norton's mechanical design predates the paper by Butterworth who is usually credited as the first to describe the electronic maximally flat filter. The equations Norton gives for his filter correspond to a singly terminated Butterworth filter, that is, one driven by an ideal voltage source with no impedance, whereas the form more usually given in texts is for the doubly terminated filter with resistors at both ends, making it hard to recognise the design for what it is. Another unusual feature of Norton's filter design arises from the series capacitor, which represents the stiffness of the diaphragm. This is the only series capacitor in Norton's representation, and without it, the filter could be analysed as a low-pass prototype. Norton moves the capacitor out of the body of the filter to the input at the expense of introducing a transformer into the equivalent circuit (Norton's figure 4). Norton has used here the "turning round the L" impedance transform to achieve this.

The definitive description of the subject from this period is Maxfield and Harrison's 1926 paper. There, they describe not only how mechanical bandpass filters can be applied to sound reproduction systems, but also apply the same principles to recording systems and describe a much improved disc cutting head.

=== Volume production ===
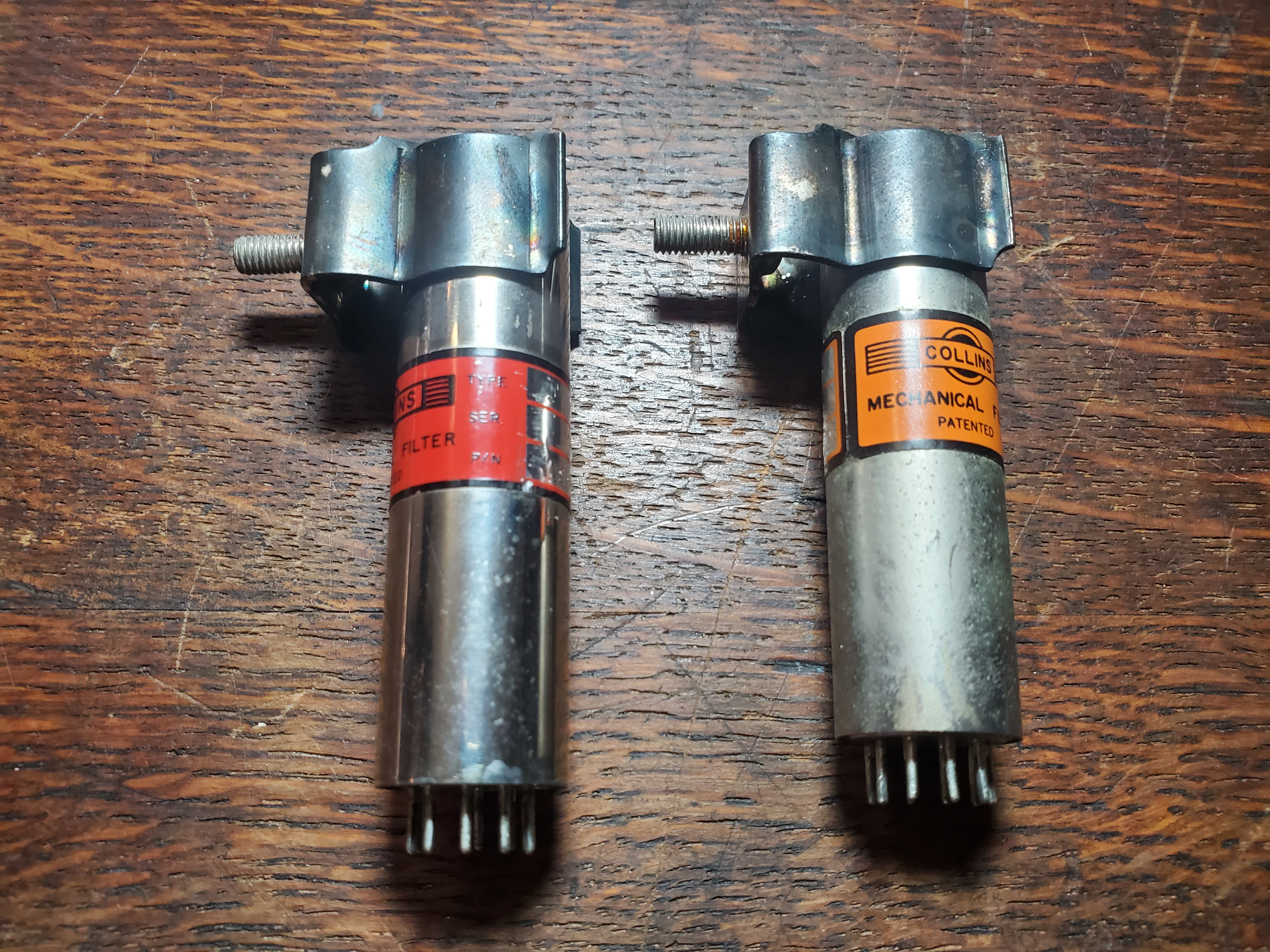
Two Collins mechanical filters. The bandwidth is, left, 500 Hz and, right, 3.1 kHz

Modern mechanical filters for intermediate frequency (IF) applications were first investigated by Robert Adler of Zenith Electronics who built a 455 kHz filter in 1946. The idea was taken up by Collins Radio Company who started the first volume production of mechanical filters from the 1950s onwards. These were originally designed for telephone frequency-division multiplex applications where there is commercial advantage in using high quality filters. Precision and steepness of the transition band leads to a reduced width of guard band, which in turn leads to the ability to squeeze more telephone channels into the same cable. This same feature is useful in radio transmitters for much the same reason. Mechanical filters quickly also found popularity in VHF/UHF radio IF stages of the high end radio sets (military, marine, amateur radio and the like) manufactured by Collins. They were favoured in the radio application because they could achieve much higher Q-factors than the equivalent LC filter. High Q allows filters to be designed which have high selectivity, important for distinguishing adjacent radio channels in receivers. They also had an advantage in stability over both LC filters and monolithic crystal filters. The most popular design for radio applications was torsional resonators because radio IF typically lies in the 100 to 500 kHz band.

== Transducers ==
Figure 4. Mechanical filter transducers. a magnetostrictive transducer. b Langevin type piezoelectric transducer. c torsional piezoelectric transducer.

Both magnetostrictive and piezoelectric transducers are used in mechanical filters. Piezoelectric transducers are favoured in recent designs since the piezoelectric material can also be used as one of the resonators of the filter, thus reducing the number of components and thereby saving space. They also avoid the susceptibility to extraneous magnetic fields of the magnetostrictive type of transducer.

=== Magnetostrictive ===
A magnetostrictive material is one which changes shape when a magnetic field is applied. In reverse, it produces a magnetic field when distorted. The magnetostrictive transducer requires a coil of conducting wire around the magnetostrictive material. The coil either induces a magnetic field in the transducer and sets it in motion or else picks up an induced current from the motion of the transducer at the filter output. It is also usually necessary to have a small magnet to bias the magnetostrictive material into its operating range. It is possible to dispense with the magnets if the biasing is taken care of on the electronic side by providing a d.c. current superimposed on the signal, but this approach would detract from the generality of the filter design.

The usual magnetostrictive materials used for the transducer are either ferrite or compressed powdered iron. Mechanical filter designs often have the resonators coupled with steel or nickel-iron wires, but on some designs, especially older ones, nickel wire may be used for the input and output rods. This is because it is possible to wind the transducer coil directly on to a nickel coupling wire since nickel is slightly magnetostrictive. However, it is not strongly so and coupling to the electrical circuit is weak. This scheme also has the disadvantage of eddy currents, a problem that is avoided if ferrites are used instead of nickel.

The coil of the transducer adds some inductance on the electrical side of the filter. It is common practice to add a capacitor in parallel with the coil so that an additional resonator is formed which can be incorporated into the filter design. While this will not improve performance to the extent that an additional mechanical resonator would, there is some benefit and the coil has to be there in any case.

=== Piezoelectric ===
A piezoelectric material is one which changes shape when an electric field is applied. In reverse, it produces an electric field when it is distorted. A piezoelectric transducer, in essence, is made simply by plating electrodes on to the piezoelectric material. Early piezoelectric materials used in transducers such as barium titanate had poor temperature stability. This precluded the transducer from functioning as one of the resonators; it had to be a separate component. This problem was solved with the introduction of lead zirconate titanate (abbreviated PZT) which is stable enough to be used as a resonator. Another common piezoelectric material is quartz, which has also been used in mechanical filters. However, ceramic materials such as PZT are preferred for their greater electromechanical coupling coefficient.

One type of piezoelectric transducer is the Langevin type, named after a transducer used by Paul Langevin in early sonar research. This is good for longitudinal modes of vibration. It can also be used on resonators with other modes of vibration if the motion can be mechanically converted into a longitudinal motion. The transducer consists of a layer of piezoelectric material sandwiched transversally into a coupling rod or resonator.

Another kind of piezoelectric transducer has the piezoelectric material sandwiched in longitudinally, usually into the resonator itself. This kind is good for torsional vibration modes and is called a torsional transducer.

As miniaturized by using thin film manufacturing methods piezoelectric resonators are called thin-film bulk acoustic resonators (FBARs).

== Resonators ==
Material	Q-factor
Nickel	several 100
Steel	several 1000
Aluminium	~10,000
Nickel-iron alloy	10,000 to 25,000 depending on composition

It is possible to achieve an extremely high Q with mechanical resonators. Mechanical resonators typically have a Q of 10,000 or so, and 25,000 can be achieved in torsional resonators using a particular nickel-iron alloy. This is an unreasonably high figure to achieve with LC circuits, whose Q is limited by the resistance of the inductor coils.

Early designs in the 1940s and 1950s started by using steel as a resonator material. This has given way to nickel-iron alloys, primarily to maximise the Q since this is often the primary appeal of mechanical filters rather than price. Some of the metals that have been used for mechanical filter resonators and their Q are shown in the table.

Piezoelectric crystals are also sometimes used in mechanical filter designs. This is especially true for resonators that are also acting as transducers for inputs and outputs.

One advantage that mechanical filters have over LC electrical filters is that they can be made very stable. The resonance frequency can be made so stable that it varies only 1.5 parts per billion (ppb) from the specified value over the operating temperature range (−25 to 85 °C), and its average drift with time can be as low as 4 ppb per day. This stability with temperature is another reason for using nickel-iron as the resonator material. Variations with temperature in the resonance frequency (and other features of the frequency function) are directly related to variations in the Young's modulus, which is a measure of stiffness of the material. Materials are therefore sought that have a small temperature coefficient of Young's modulus. In general, Young's modulus has a negative temperature coefficient (materials become less stiff with increasing temperature) but additions of small amounts of certain other elements in the alloy (Note: The first alloy to be discovered with this property was Elinvar for which, together with Invar, Charles Edouard Guillaume received the Nobel Prize in 1920. The original application was for temperature compensation of scientific measuring instruments, clocks and marine chronometers.) can produce a material with a temperature coefficient that changes sign from negative through zero to positive with temperature. Such a material will have a zero coefficient of temperature with resonance frequency around a particular temperature. It is possible to adjust the point of zero temperature coefficient to a desired position by heat treatment of the alloy.

=== Resonator modes ===
Figure 5. Some possible vibrational modes of resonators; The modes shown are (5a) the second longitudinal mode fixed at one end, (5b) the first torsional mode, (5c) the second torsional mode, (5d) the second flexural mode, (5e) the first radial expansion mode, and (5f) the first radially symmetric drumhead mode.

It is usually possible for a mechanical part to vibrate in a number of different modes, however the design will be based on a particular vibrational mode and the designer will take steps to try to restrict the resonance to this mode. As well as the straightforward longitudinal mode some others which are used include flexural mode, torsional mode, radial mode and drumhead mode.

Modes are numbered according to the number of half-wavelengths in the vibration. Some modes exhibit vibrations in more than one direction (such as drumhead mode which has two) and consequently the mode number consists of more than one number. When the vibration is in one of the higher modes, there will be multiple nodes on the resonator where there is no motion. For some types of resonator, this can provide a convenient place to make a mechanical attachment for structural support. Wires attached at nodes will have no effect on the vibration of the resonator or the overall filter response. In figure 5, some possible anchor points are shown as wires attached at the nodes.

== Circuit designs ==
Figure 6. A mechanical filter using disc flexural resonators and magnetostrictive transducers

Figure 7. A filter using longitudinal resonators and Langevin type transducers

Figure 8a. A filter using torsional resonators. The input is shown with a torsional piezoelectric transducer and the output has a magnetostrictive transducer.

Figure 8b. Equivalent circuit of the torsional resonator circuit above

Figure 9. A filter using disc drumhead resonators

There are a great many combinations of resonators and transducers that can be used to construct a mechanical filter. A selection of some of these is shown in the diagrams. Figure 6 shows a filter using disc flexural resonators and magnetostrictive transducers. The transducer drives the centre of the first resonator, causing it to vibrate. The edges of the disc move in antiphase to the centre when the driving signal is at, or close to, resonance, and the signal is transmitted through the connecting rods to the next resonator. When the driving signal is not close to resonance, there is little movement at the edges, and the filter rejects (does not pass) the signal. Figure 7 shows a similar idea involving longitudinal resonators connected together in a chain by connecting rods. In this diagram, the filter is driven by piezoelectric transducers. It could equally well have used magnetostrictive transducers. Figure 8 shows a filter using torsional resonators. In this diagram, the input has a torsional piezoelectric transducer and the output has a magnetostrictive transducer. This would be quite unusual in a real design, as both input and output usually have the same type of transducer. The magnetostrictive transducer is only shown here to demonstrate how longitudinal vibrations may be converted to torsional vibrations and vice versa. Figure 9 shows a filter using drumhead mode resonators. The edges of the discs are fixed to the casing of the filter (not shown in the diagram) so the vibration of the disc is in the same modes as the membrane of a drum. Collins calls this type of filter a disc wire filter.

The various types of resonator are all particularly suited to different frequency bands. Overall, mechanical filters with lumped elements of all kinds can cover frequencies from about 5 to 700 kHz although mechanical filters down as low as a few kilohertz (kHz) are rare. The lower part of this range, below 100 kHz, is best covered with bar flexural resonators. The upper part is better done with torsional resonators. Drumhead disc resonators are in the middle, covering the range from around 100 to 300 kHz.

The frequency response behaviour of all mechanical filters can be expressed as an equivalent electrical circuit using the impedance analogy described above. An example of this is shown in figure 8b which is the equivalent circuit of the mechanical filter of figure 8a. Elements on the electrical side, such as the inductance of the magnetostrictive transducer, are omitted but would be taken into account in a complete design. The series resonant circuits on the circuit diagram represent the torsional resonators, and the shunt capacitors represent the coupling wires. The component values of the electrical equivalent circuit can be adjusted, more or less at will, by modifying the dimensions of the mechanical components. In this way, all the theoretical tools of electrical analysis and filter design can be brought to bear on the mechanical design. Any filter realisable in electrical theory can, in principle, also be realised as a mechanical filter. In particular, the popular finite element approximations to an ideal filter response of the Butterworth and Chebyshev filters can both readily be realised. As with the electrical counterpart, the more elements that are used, the closer the approximation approaches the ideal, however, for practical reasons the number of resonators does not normally exceed eight.

=== Semi-lumped designs ===
Figure 10a. A semi-lumped design using disc flexural resonators and λ/2 coupling wires

Figure 10b. Equivalent circuit of the semi-lumped circuit above

Frequencies of the order of megahertz (MHz) are above the usual range for mechanical filters. The components start to become very small, or alternatively the components are large compared to the signal wavelength. The lumped-element model described above starts to break down and the components must be considered as distributed elements. The frequency at which the transition from lumped to distributed modeling takes place is much lower for mechanical filters than it is for their electrical counterparts. This is because mechanical vibrations travel at the speed of sound for the material the component is composed of. For solid components, this is many times (x15 for nickel-iron) the speed of sound in air (343 m/s) but still considerably less than the speed of electromagnetic waves (approx. 3.00×10^{8} m/s in vacuum). Consequently, mechanical wavelengths are much shorter than electrical wavelengths for the same frequency. Advantage can be taken of these effects by deliberately designing components to be distributed elements, and the components and methods used in electrical distributed-element filters can be brought to bear. The equivalents of stubs and impedance transformers are both achievable. Designs which use a mixture of lumped and distributed elements are referred to as semi-lumped.

An example of such a design is shown in figure 10a. The resonators are disc flexural resonators similar to those shown in figure 6, except that these are energised from an edge, leading to vibration in the fundamental flexural mode with a node in the centre, whereas the figure 6 design is energised in the centre leading to vibration in the second flexural mode at resonance. The resonators are mechanically attached to the housing by pivots at right angles to the coupling wires. The pivots are to ensure free turning of the resonator and minimise losses. The resonators are treated as lumped elements; however, the coupling wires are made exactly one half-wavelength (λ/2) long and are equivalent to a λ/2 open circuit stub in the electrical equivalent circuit. For a narrow-band filter, a stub of this sort has the approximate equivalent circuit of a parallel shunt tuned circuit as shown in figure 10b. Consequently, the connecting wires are being used in this design to add additional resonators into the circuit and will have a better response than one with just the lumped resonators and short couplings. For even higher frequencies, microelectromechanical methods can be used as described below.

=== Bridging wires ===
Bridging wires are rods that couple together resonators that are not adjacent. They can be used to produce poles of attenuation in the stopband. This has the benefit of increasing the stopband rejection. When the pole is placed near the passband edge, it also has the benefit of increasing roll-off and narrowing the transition band. The typical effects of some of these on filter frequency response are shown in figure 11. Bridging across a single resonator (figure 11b) can produce a pole of attenuation in the high stopband. Bridging across two resonators (figure 11c) can produce a pole of attenuation in both the high and the low stopband. Using multiple bridges (figure 11d) will result in multiple poles of attenuation. In this way, the attenuation of the stopbands can be deepened over a broad frequency range.

Figure 11. Schematic bridging arrangements and their effect on frequency response.

The method of coupling between non-adjacent resonators is not limited to mechanical filters. It can be applied to other filter formats and the general term for this class is cross-coupled filter. For instance, channels can be cut between cavity resonators, mutual inductance can be used with discrete component filters, and feedback paths can be used with active analogue or digital filters. Nor was the method first discovered in the field of mechanical filters; the earliest description is in a 1948 patent for filters using microwave cavity resonators. However, mechanical filter designers were the first (1960s) to develop practical filters of this kind and the method became a particular feature of mechanical filters.

== Microelectromechanical filters ==
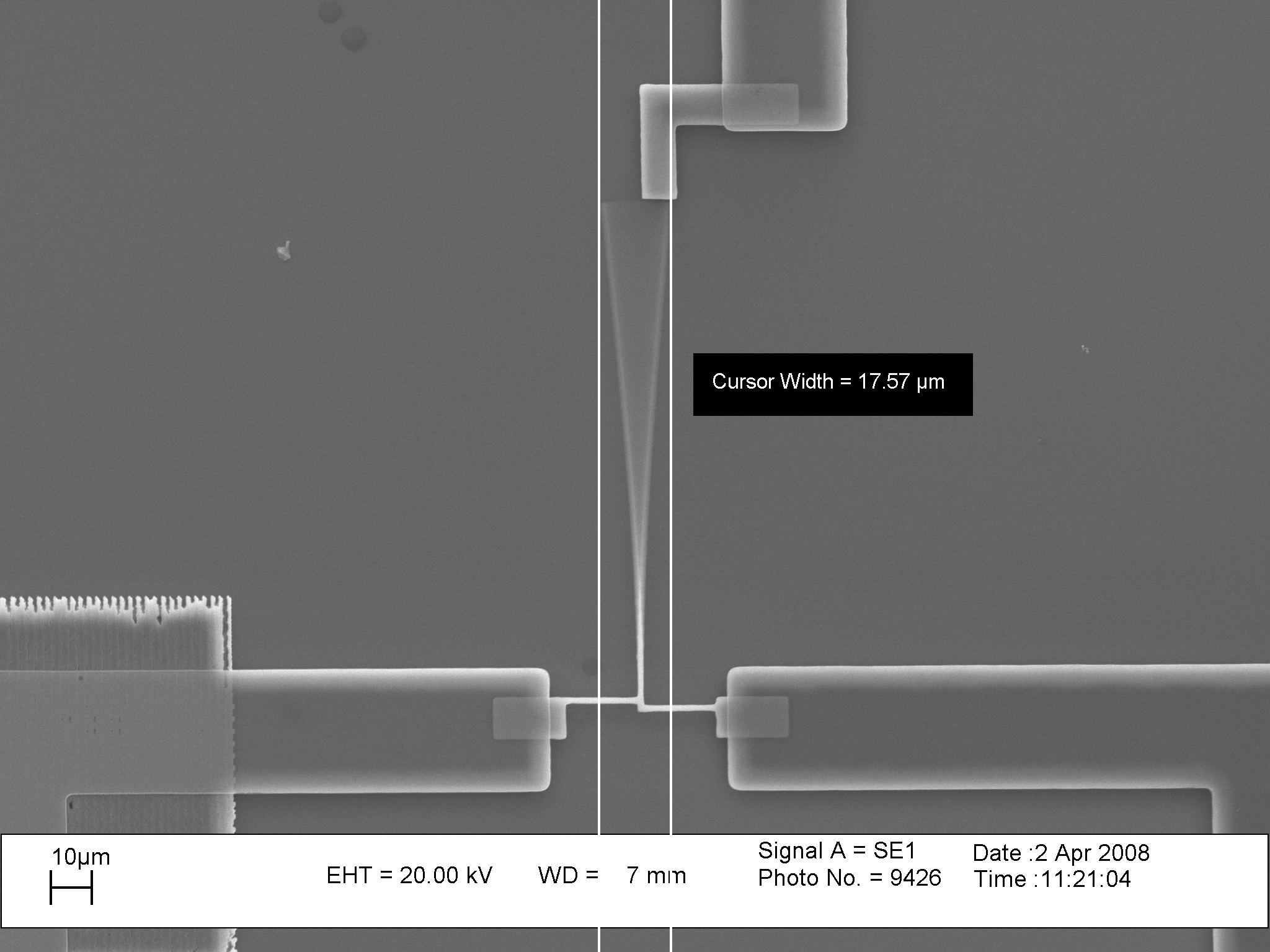
Figure 12. MEMS cantilever resonator. The device can be seen to be vibrating in this picture.

A new technology emerging in mechanical filtering is microelectromechanical systems (MEMS). MEMS are very small micromachines with component sizes measured in micrometres (μm), but not as small as nanomachines. These filters can be designed to operate at much higher frequencies than can be achieved with traditional mechanical filters. These systems are mostly fabricated from silicon (Si), silicon nitride (Si_{3}N_{4}), or polymers. A common component used for radio frequency filtering (and MEMS applications generally), is the cantilever resonator. Cantilevers are simple mechanical components to manufacture by much the same methods used by the semiconductor industry; masking, photolithography and etching, with a final undercutting etch to separate the cantilever from the substrate. The technology has great promise since cantilevers can be produced in large numbers on a single substrate—much as large numbers of transistors are currently contained on a single silicon chip.

The resonator shown in figure 12 is around 120 μm in length. Experimental complete filters with an operating frequency of 30 GHz have been produced using cantilever varactors as the resonator elements. The size of this filter is around 4×3.5 mm. Cantilever resonators are typically applied at frequencies below 200 MHz, but other structures, such as micro-machined cavities, can be used in the microwave bands. Extremely high Q resonators can be made with this technology; flexural mode resonators with a Q in excess of 80,000 at 8 MHz are reported.

== Adjustment ==
The precision applications in which mechanical filters are used require that the resonators are accurately adjusted to the specified resonance frequency. This is known as trimming and usually involves a mechanical machining process. In most filter designs, this can be difficult to do once the resonators have been assembled into the complete filter so the resonators are trimmed before assembly. Trimming is done in at least two stages; coarse and fine, with each stage bringing the resonance frequency closer to the specified value. Most trimming methods involve removing material from the resonator which will increase the resonance frequency. The target frequency for a coarse trimming stage consequently needs to be set below the final frequency since the tolerances of the process could otherwise result in a frequency higher than the following fine trimming stage could adjust for.

The coarsest method of trimming is grinding of the main resonating surface of the resonator; this process has an accuracy of around ±800 ppm. Better control can be achieved by grinding the edge of the resonator instead of the main surface. This has a less dramatic effect and consequently better accuracy. Processes that can be used for fine trimming, in order of increasing accuracy, are sandblasting, drilling, and laser ablation. Laser trimming is capable of achieving an accuracy of ±40 ppm.

Trimming by hand, rather than machine, was used on some early production components but would now normally only be encountered during product development. Methods available include sanding and filing. It is also possible to add material to the resonator by hand, thus reducing the resonance frequency. One such method is to add solder, but this is not suitable for production use since the solder will tend to reduce the high Q of the resonator.

In the case of MEMS filters, it is not possible to trim the resonators outside of the filter because of the integrated nature of the device construction. However, trimming is still a requirement in many MEMS applications. Laser ablation can be used for this but material deposition methods are available as well as material removal. These methods include laser or ion-beam induced deposition.

== See also ==
- Ceramic resonator
- Surface acoustic wave
- Crystal oscillator
- Reed receiver

== Bibliography ==
- Blanchard, J. (1944). "The history of electrical resonance". Bell System Technical Journal. 23: 415–433.
- Carr, Joseph J. (2002). RF Components and Circuits. Oxford, UK: Newnes. ISBN 0-7506-4844-9 – via Google Books.
- Darlington, S. (1984). "A history of network synthesis and filter theory for circuits composed of resistors, inductors, and capacitors". IEEE Transactions on Circuits and Systems. 31 (1): 3–13. Bibcode:1984ITCS...31....3D. doi:10.1109/TCS.1984.1085415.
- Drentea, Cornell (2010). Modern Communications Receiver Design and Technology. Artech House. ISBN 978-1596933101.
- Eargle, J.M. (2003). Loudspeaker Handbook. Boston, MA: Kluwer Academic Publishers. ISBN 1-4020-7584-7 – via Google Books.
- Gatti, Paolo L.; Ferrari, Vittorio (1999). Applied Structural and Mechanical Vibrations: Theory, methods, and measuring instrumentation. London, UK: Taylor & Francis. ISBN 0-419-22710-5.
- US 2762985, George, R W., "Mechanically resonant filter devices", issued 11 Sep 1956
- Gould, Rupert T. (1960). The Marine Chronometer. London, UK: Holland Press. OCLC 246850269.
- US 1730425, Harrison, Henry C., "Acoustic device", issued 8 October 1929 (filed in Germany 21 October 1923)
- US 1773082, Harrison, Henry C., "Electromagnetic system", issued 12 August 1930
- Hunt, Frederick V. (1954). Electroacoustics: The analysis of transduction, and its historical background. Cambridge, MA: Harvard University Press. OCLC 2042530.
- Johnson, Robert A. (January 1968). "Electrical circuit models of disk-wire mechanical filters". IEEE Transactions on Sonics and Ultrasonics. 15 (1): 41–50. Bibcode:1968ITSU...15...41J. doi:10.1109/T-SU.1968.29444. ISSN 0018-9537.
- Johnson, Robert A. (1983). Mechanical Filters in Electronics. New York, NY: Wiley. ISBN 0-471-08919-2.
- US 4395849, Kasai, Yoshihiko & Hayashi, Tsunenori, "Automatic frequency adjusting method for mechanical resonators", issued 2 August 1983
- Levy, R.; Cohn, S.B. (1984). "A history of microwave filter research, design, and development". IEEE Transactions on Microwave Theory and Techniques. 32 (9): 1055–1067. Bibcode:1984ITMTT..32.1055L. doi:10.1109/TMTT.1984.1132817.
- Lin, Liwei; Howe, Roger T.; Pisano, Albert P. (1998). "Microelectromechanical filters for signal processing" (PDF). Journal of Microelectromechanical Systems. 7 (3): 286. Bibcode:1998JMemS...7..286L. doi:10.1109/84.709645. Archived from the original (PDF) on 19 July 2011 – via berkeley.edu.
- Lundheim, L. (2002). "On Shannon and 'Shannon's formula'" (PDF). Telektronikk. 98 (1): 20–29. Archived from the original (PDF) on 24 July 2011 – via iet.ntnu.no.
- US 2981905, Mason, W.P., "Electromechanical wave filter", issued 25 April 1961
- Matthaei, George L.; Young, Leo; Jones, E.M.T. (1964). Microwave Filters, Impedance-Matching Networks, and Coupling Structures. New York, NY: McGraw-Hill. OCLC 282667.
- US 1792655, Norton, Edward L., "Sound reproducer", issued 17 February 1931
- Pierce, Allan D. (1989). Acoustics: An introduction to its physical principles and applications. New York, NY: Acoustical Society of America. ISBN 0-88318-612-8 – via Google Books.
- Rosen, Carol Zwick; Hiremath, Basavaraj V.; Newnham, Robert Everest, eds. (1992). Piezoelectricity. New York, NY: American Institute of Physics. ISBN 0-88318-647-0 – via Google Books.
- de los Santos, Héctor J. (2002). RF MEMS Circuit Design for Wireless Communications. Boston, MA: Artech House. ISBN 1-58053-329-9 – via Google Books.
- Talbot-Smith, Michael (2001). Audio Engineer's Reference Book. Oxford, UK: Focal Press. ISBN 0-240-51685-0 – via Google Books.
- Taylor, John T.; Huang, Qiuting (1997). CRC Handbook of Electrical Filters. Boca Raton, FL: CRC Press. ISBN 0-8493-8951-8 – via Google Books.
