= Mechanical impedance =

Relationship between harmonic force and velocity

Mechanical impedance is a measure of how much a structure resists motion when subjected to a harmonic force. It relates forces with velocities acting on a mechanical system. The mechanical impedance of a point on a structure is the ratio of the force applied at a point to the resulting velocity at that point.

Mechanical impedance is the inverse of mechanical admittance or mobility. The mechanical impedance is a function of the frequency $\omega$ of the applied force and can vary greatly over frequency. At resonance frequencies, the mechanical impedance will be lower, meaning less force is needed to cause a structure to move at a given velocity. A simple example of this is pushing a child on a swing. For the greatest swing amplitude, the frequency of the pushes must be near the resonant frequency of the system.

$$\mathbf{F}(\omega) = \mathbf{Z}(\omega)\mathbf{v}(\omega)$$

Where, $\mathbf{F}$ is the force vector, $\mathbf{v}$ is the velocity vector, $\mathbf{Z}$ is the impedance matrix and $\omega$ is the angular frequency.

Mechanical impedance is the ratio of a potential (e.g., force) to a flow (e.g., velocity) where the arguments of the real (or imaginary) parts of both increase linearly with time. Examples of potentials are: force, sound pressure, voltage, temperature. Examples of flows are: velocity, volume velocity, current, heat flow. Impedance is the reciprocal of mobility. If the potential and flow quantities are measured at the same point then impedance is referred as driving point impedance; otherwise, transfer impedance.

== Damped driven harmonic oscillator ==
A standard example used to illustrate mechanical impedance is the damped driven harmonic oscillator, consisting of a mass–spring–damper system subjected to a harmonic force. Its equation of motion is

$$m\ddot{x}(t) + c\dot{x}(t) + kx(t) = F_0 e^{i\omega t}$$

where $m$ is the mass, $c$ the damping coefficient, $k$ the stiffness, and $F_0 e^{i\omega t}$ the applied harmonic force.

Assuming steady-state harmonic motion of the form $x(t) = X e^{i\omega t}$, the velocity is $v(t) = i\omega X e^{i\omega t}$. Substituting into the equation of motion gives the frequency-domain relationship between force and velocity:

$$F(\omega) = Z(\omega)\,v(\omega)$$

where the mechanical impedance $Z(\omega)$ is

$$Z(\omega) = c + i\left(\omega m - \frac{k}{\omega}\right)$$

Alternatively, expressing the impedance in normalized form,

$$Z(\omega) = \frac{m}{\omega}\left[i(\omega^2 - \omega_0^2) + \gamma \omega\right]$$

where $\omega_0 = \sqrt{k/m}$ is the natural frequency and $\gamma = c/m$ is the damping ratio.

The impedance can be decomposed into the mechanical resistance and mechanical reactance:

$$Z(\omega) = R(\omega) + iX(\omega)$$

where

$$R(\omega) = c, \quad X(\omega) = \omega m - \frac{k}{\omega}$$

The term $\omega m$ is known as the inertial reactance, while $-k/\omega$ is the elastic reactance. At the resonant frequency $\omega_0 = \sqrt{k/m}$, the reactance vanishes and the impedance is purely real:

$$Z(\omega_0) = c$$

indicating that the system’s response is limited only by damping.

=== Electrical analogy ===
The form of the mechanical impedance is directly analogous to the impedance of a series RLC circuit where $j$ is used to mean the imaginary number $i$ to avoid confusion:

$$Z(\omega) = R + j\left(\omega L - \frac{1}{\omega C}\right)$$

Under the impedance analogy, the correspondence between mechanical and electrical quantities is:

Mechanical quantity	Electrical analogue
Force $F$	Voltage $V$
Velocity $v$	Current $I$
Mass $m$	Inductance $L$
Damping $c$	Resistance $R$
Stiffness $k$	Inverse capacitance $1/C$

== See also ==
- Acoustic impedance
- Frequency response
- Impedance analogy
- Linear response function
