= General mn-type image filter =

These filters are electrical wave filters designed using the image method. They are an invention of Otto Zobel at AT&T Corp. They are a generalisation of the m-type filter in that a transform is applied that modifies the transfer function while keeping the image impedance unchanged. For filters that have only one stopband there is no distinction with the m-type filter. However, for a filter that has multiple stopbands, there is the possibility that the form of the transfer function in each stopband can be different. For instance, it may be required to filter one band with the sharpest possible cut-off, but in another to minimise phase distortion while still achieving some attenuation. If the form is identical at each transition from passband to stopband the filter will be the same as an m-type filter (k-type filter in the limiting case of m=1). If they are different, then the general case described here pertains.

The k-type filter acts as a prototype for producing the general m_{n} designs. For any given desired bandform there are two classes of m_{n} transformation that can be applied, namely, the mid-series and mid-shunt derived sections; this terminology being more fully explained in the m-derived filter article. Another feature of m-type filters that also applies in the general case is that a half section will have the original k-type image impedance on one side only. The other port will present a new image impedance. The two transformations have equivalent transfer functions but differ in terms of their image impedances and circuit configurations.

Bandform diagram showing frequency response of a general image filter. The ω_{c} are the critical frequencies (the frequency where cut-off begins) and the ω_{∞} are the poles of attenuation in the stop bands.

Parts of this article or section rely on the reader's knowledge of the complex impedance representation of capacitors and inductors and on knowledge of the frequency domain representation of signals.

== Mid-series multiple stopband ==

If Z and Y are the series impedance and shunt admittance of a constant k half section and;

$$Z = Z_1 + Z_2 + Z_3 + \dots + Z_N$$

where Z_{1}, Z_{2} etc are a cascade of antiresonators,

the transformed series impedance for a mid-series derived filter becomes;

$$Z_{m_n} = m_1Z_1 + m_2Z_2 + m_3Z_3 + \dots + m_NZ_N$$

Where the m_{n} are arbitrary positive coefficients. For an invariant image impedance Z_{iT} and invariant bandform (that is, invariant cut-off frequencies ω_{c}) the transformed shunt admittance, expressed in terms of Z_{m_{n}}, is given by;

$$Y_{m_n} = \frac {Z_{m_n}} {k^2 + Z^2 - Z_{m_n}^2}$$

where $k = \sqrt{\frac{Z}{Y}}$ and is a constant by definition. When the m_{n} are all equal this reduces to the expression for an m-type filter and where they are all equal to one it reduces further to the k-type filter.

2-bandstop mid-series derived m_{1}, m_{2} filter half-section

A result of this relationship is that the N antiresonators in Z_{m_{n}} will transform into 2N resonators in Y_{m_{n}}. The coefficients m_{n} can be adjusted by the designer to set the frequency of one of the two poles of attenuation, ω_{∞}, in each stopband. The second pole of attenuation is dependent and cannot be set separately.

=== Special cases ===
In the case of a filter with a stopband extending to zero frequency, one of the antiresonators in Z will reduce to a single inductor. In this case, the resonators in Y_{m_{n}} are reduced by one to 2N-1. Similarly, for a filter with a stopband extending to infinity, one antiresonator will reduce to a single capacitor and the resonators will again be reduced by one. In a filter where both conditions pertain, the number of resonators will be 2N-2. For these end stopbands, there is only one pole of attenuation in each, as would be expected from the reduced number of resonators. These forms are the maximum allowable complexity while maintaining invariance of bandform and one image impedance.

== Mid-shunt multiple stopband ==
2-bandstop mid-shunt derived m1, m2 filter half-section. Frequency response is equivalent to the corresponding mid-series derived filter

By dual analogy, the shunt-derived filter starts from;

$$Y_{m_n} = m_1Y_1 + m_2Y_2 + m_3Y_3 + \dots + m_NY_N$$

For an invariant image admittance Y_{iΠ} and invariant bandform the transformed series impedance is given by;

$$Z_{m_n} = \frac {Y_{m_n}} {k^2 + Y^2 - Y_{m_n}^2}$$

== Simple bandpass section ==
General image bandpass filter, mid-shunt derived

The bandpass filter can be characterised as a 2-bandstop filter with ω_{c} = 0 for the lower critical frequency of the lower band and ω_{c} = ∞ for the upper critical frequency of the upper band. The two resonators reduce to an inductor and a capacitor, respectively. The number of antiresonators reduces to two.

Image bandpass filter with ω_{∞1} set to zero and ω_{∞2} set to correspond to ω'_{c1}.

If, however, ω_{∞1} is set to zero (that is, there is no pole of attenuation in the lower stopband) and ω_{∞2} is set to correspond to the upper critical frequency ω'_{c1}, then a particularly simple form of the bandpass filter is obtained consisting of just antiresonators coupled by capacitors. This was a popular topology for multi-section band-pass filters due to its low component count, particularly of inductors. Many other such reduced forms are possible by setting one of the poles of attenuation to correspond to one of the critical frequencies for various classes of the basic filter.

== See also ==
Filter bandforms: see, low-pass, high-pass, band-pass, band-stop.

- Image impedance
- Constant k filter
- m-derived filter
- mm'-type filter
- Composite image filter
