= Nominal impedance =

Concept in electrical and audio engineering

Nominal impedance in electrical engineering and audio engineering refers to the approximate designed impedance of an electrical circuit or device. The term is applied in a number of different fields, most often being encountered in respect of:

- The nominal value of the characteristic impedance of a cable or other form of transmission line.
- The nominal value of the input, output or image impedance of a port of a network, especially a network intended for use with a transmission line, such as filters, equalisers and amplifiers.
- The nominal value of the input impedance of a radio frequency antenna

The actual impedance may vary quite considerably from the nominal figure with changes in frequency. In the case of cables and other transmission lines, there is also variation along the length of the cable, if it is not properly terminated.

It is usual practice to speak of nominal impedance as if it were a constant resistance, that is, it is invariant with frequency and has a zero reactive component, despite this often being far from the case. Depending on the field of application, nominal impedance is implicitly referring to a specific point on the frequency response of the circuit under consideration. This may be at low-frequency, mid-band or some other point and specific applications are discussed in the sections below.

In most applications, there are a number of values of nominal impedance that are recognised as being standard. The nominal impedance of a component or circuit is often assigned one of these standard values, regardless of whether the measured impedance exactly corresponds to it. The item is assigned the nearest standard value.

== 600 Ω ==
Nominal impedance first started to be specified in the early days of telecommunications. At first, amplifiers were not available and, when they did become available, they were expensive. It was consequently necessary to achieve maximum power transfer from the cable at the receiving end in order to maximize the lengths of cables that could be installed. It also became apparent that reflections on the transmission line would severely limit the bandwidth that could be used or the distance that it was practicable to transmit. Matching equipment impedance to the characteristic impedance of the cable reduces reflections (and they are eliminated altogether if the match is perfect) and power transfer is maximised. To this end, all cables and equipment started to be specified to a standard nominal impedance. The earliest, and still the most widespread, standard is 600 Ω, originally used for telephony. The choice of this figure had more to do with the way telephones were interfaced into the local exchange than any characteristic of the local telephone cable. Telephones (old style analogue telephones) connect to the exchange through twisted pair cabling. Each leg of the pair is connected to a relay coil which detects the signalling on the line (dialling, handset off-hook etc.). The other end of one coil is connected to a supply voltage and the second coil is connected to ground. A telephone exchange relay coil is around 300 Ω, so the two of them together are terminating the line in 600 Ω.

Variation of characteristic impedance with frequency. At audio frequencies, the impedance is far from constant and the nominal value is only correct at one frequency.

The wiring to the subscriber in telephone networks is generally done in twisted pair cable. Its impedance at audio frequencies, and especially at the more restricted telephone band frequencies, is far from constant. It is possible to manufacture this kind of cable to have a 600 Ω characteristic impedance but it will only be this value at one specific frequency. This might be quoted as a nominal 600 Ω impedance at 800 Hz or 1 kHz. Below this frequency, the characteristic impedance rapidly rises and becomes more and more dominated by the ohmic resistance of the cable as the frequency falls. At the bottom of the audio band, the impedance can be several tens of kilohms. On the other hand, at high frequency in the MHz region, the characteristic impedance flattens out to something almost constant. The reason for this response lies in primary line constants.

Local area networks (LANs) commonly use a similar kind of twisted pair cable, but screened and manufactured to tighter tolerances than is necessary for telephony. Even though it has a very similar impedance to telephone cable, the nominal impedance is rated at 100 Ω. This is because the LAN data is in a higher frequency band where the characteristic impedance is substantially flat and mostly resistive.

Standardisation of line nominal impedance led to two-port networks such as filters being designed to a matching nominal impedance. The nominal impedance of low-pass symmetrical T- or Pi-filter sections (or more generally, image filter sections) is defined as the limit of the filter image impedance as the frequency approaches zero and is given by,

$$Z_\mathrm {nom}=\sqrt \frac{L}{C}$$

where L and C are as defined in constant k filter. This impedance is purely resistive. This filter, when transformed to a band-pass filter, will have an impedance equal to the nominal impedance at resonance rather than low frequency. This nominal impedance of filters will generally be the same as the nominal impedance of the circuit or cable that the filter is working into.

While 600 Ω is an almost universal standard in telephony for local presentation at customer's premises from the exchange, for long distance transmission on trunk lines between exchanges, other standard nominal impedances are used and are usually lower, such as 150 Ω.

== 50 Ω and 75 Ω ==
In the field of radio frequency (RF) and microwave engineering, by far and away the most common transmission line standard is 50 Ω coaxial cable (coax), which is an unbalanced line. 50 Ω first arose as a nominal impedance during World War II work on radar and is a compromise between two requirements. This standard was the work of the wartime US joint Army-Navy RF Cable Coordinating Committee. The first requirement is for minimum loss. The loss of coaxial cable is given by,

$\alpha \approx \frac{R}{2Z_0}$ nepers/metre

where R is the loop resistance per metre and Z_{0} is the characteristic impedance. Making the diameter of the inner conductor larger will decrease R and decreasing R decreases the loss. On the other hand, Z_{0} depends on the ratio of the diameters of outer and inner conductors (D_{r}) and will decrease with increasing inner conductor diameter thus increasing the loss. There is a specific value of D_{r} for which the loss is a minimum, which turns out to be 3.6. For an air dielectric coax, this corresponds to a characteristic impedance of 77 Ω. The coax produced during the WW2 was rigid air-insulated pipe, and this remained the case for some time afterwards. The second requirement is for maximum power handling and was an important requirement for radar. This is not the same condition as minimum loss, because power handling is usually limited by the breakdown voltage of the dielectric. However, there is a similar compromise in terms of the ratio of conductor diameters. Making the inner conductor too large results in a thin insulator which breaks down at a lower voltage. On the other hand, making the inner conductor too small results in higher electric field strength near the inner conductor (because the same field energy is accumulated around smaller conductor surface) and again reduces the breakdown voltage. The ideal ratio, D_{r}, for maximum power handling, is 1.65 and corresponds to a characteristic impedance of 30 Ω in air. The 50 Ω impedance is the geometric mean of these two figures;

$$50 \approx \sqrt {30 \times 77} \mathrm \ \Omega$$

and then rounding to a convenient whole number.

Wartime production of coax, and for a period afterwards, tended to use standard plumbing pipe sizes for the outer conductor and standard AWG sizes for the inner conductor. This resulted in coax that was nearly, but not quite, 50 Ω. Matching is a much more critical requirement at radio frequencies than it is at voice frequencies, so when cable started to become available, that was truly 50 Ω and a need arose for matching circuits to interface between the new cables and legacy equipment, such as the rather strange 51.5 Ω to 50 Ω matching network.

While 30 Ω cable is highly desirable for its power handling capabilities, it has never been in commercial production because the large size of inner conductor makes it difficult to manufacture. This is not the case with 77 Ω cable. Cable with 75 Ω nominal impedance has been in use from an early period in telecommunications for its low loss characteristic. According to Stephen Lampen of Belden Wire & Cable, 75 Ω was chosen as the nominal impedance rather than 77 Ω because it corresponded to a standard AWG wire size for the inner conductor. For coax video cables and interfaces, 75 Ω is now the near universal standard nominal impedance.

== Radio antennae ==
The widespread idea that 50 Ω and 75 Ω cable nominal impedances arose in connection with the input impedance of various antennae is a myth. Several common antennae are easily matched to cables with these nominal impedances. A quarter wavelength monopole in free space has an impedance of 36.5 Ω, and a half wavelength dipole in free space has an impedance of 72 Ω. A half-wavelength folded dipole, commonly seen on television antennae, on the other hand, has a 288 Ω impedance—four times that of a straight-line dipole. The 1/2 λ dipole and the 1/2 λ folded dipole are commonly taken as having nominal impedances of 75 Ω and 300 Ω, respectively.

An installed antenna's feed-point impedance varies above and below the quoted value, depending on its installation height above the ground and the electrical properties of the surrounding earth.

== Cable quality ==
One measure of cable manufacturing and installation quality is how closely the characteristic impedance adheres to the nominal impedance along its length. Impedance changes can be caused by variations in geometry along the cable length. In turn, these can be caused by a faulty manufacturing process or by faulty installation, such as not observing limits on bend radii. Unfortunately, there is no easy, non-destructive method of directly measuring impedance along a cable's length. It can, however, be indicated indirectly by measuring reflections, that is, return loss. Return loss by itself does not reveal much, since the cable design will have some intrinsic return loss anyway due to not having a purely resistive characteristic impedance. The technique used is to carefully adjust the cable termination to obtain as close a match as possible and then to measure the variation of return loss with frequency. The minimum return loss so measured is called the structural return loss (SRL). SRL is a measure of a cables' adherence to its nominal impedance, but it is not a direct correspondence, as errors further from the generator have less effect on SRL than those close to it. The measurement must also be carried out at all in-band frequencies to be significant. The reason for this is that equally spaced errors introduced by the manufacturing process will cancel and be invisible, or at least much reduced, at certain frequencies due to quarter wave impedance transformer action.

== Audio systems ==
For the most part, audio systems, both professional and domestic, have their components interconnected with low impedance outputs connected to high impedance inputs. These impedances are poorly defined and nominal impedances are not usually assigned for this kind of connection. The exact impedances make little difference to performance as long as the latter is many times larger than the former. This is a common interconnection scheme, not just for audio, but for electronic units in general which form part of a larger equipment or are only connected over a short distance. Where audio needs to be transmitted over large distances, which is often the case in broadcast engineering, considerations of matching and reflections dictate that a telecommunications standard is used, which would normally mean using 600 Ω nominal impedance, although other standards are sometimes encountered, such as sending at 75 Ω and receiving at 600 Ω which has bandwidth advantages. The nominal impedance of the transmission line and of the amplifiers and equalisers in the transmission chain will all be the same value.

Nominal impedance is used, however, to characterise the transducers of an audio system, such as its microphones and loudspeakers. It is important that these are connected to a circuit capable of dealing with impedances in the appropriate range and assigning a nominal impedance is a convenient way of quickly determining likely incompatibilities. Loudspeakers and microphones are dealt with in separate sections below.

=== Loudspeakers ===
Diagram showing the variation in impedance of a typical mid-range loudspeaker. Nominal impedance is usually determined at the lowest point after resonance. However, it is possible for the low-frequency impedance to be still lower than this.

Loudspeaker impedances are kept relatively low compared with other audio components so that the required audio power can be transmitted without using inconveniently (and dangerously) high voltages. The most common nominal impedance for loudspeakers is 8 Ω. Also used are 4 Ω and 16 Ω. The once common 16 Ω is now mostly reserved for high frequency compression drivers since the high frequency end of the audio spectrum does not usually require so much power to reproduce.

The impedance of a loudspeaker is not constant across all frequencies. In a typical loudspeaker, the impedance will rise with increasing frequency from its DC value, as shown in the diagram, until it reaches a point of its mechanical resonance. Following resonance, the impedance falls to a minimum and then begins to rise again. Speakers are usually designed to operate at frequencies above their resonance, and for this reason, it is the usual practice to define nominal impedance at this minimum and then round to the nearest standard value. The ratio of the peak resonant frequency to the nominal impedance can be as much as 4:1. It is, however, still perfectly possible for the low frequency impedance to actually be lower than the nominal impedance. A given audio amplifier may not be capable of driving this low frequency impedance even though it is capable of driving the nominal impedance, a problem that can be solved either with the use of crossover filters or underrating the amplifier supplied.

In the days of valves (vacuum tubes), most loudspeakers had a nominal impedance of 16 Ω. Valve outputs require an output transformer to match the very high output impedance and voltage of the output valves to this lower impedance. These transformers were commonly tapped to allow matching of the output to a multiple loudspeaker setup. For example, two 16 Ω loudspeakers in parallel will give an impedance of 8 Ω. Since the advent of solid-state amplifiers whose outputs require no transformer, the once-common multiple-impedance outputs have become rare, and lower impedance loudspeakers more common. The most common nominal impedance for a single loudspeaker is now 8 Ω. Most solid-state amplifiers are designed to work with loudspeaker combinations of anything from 4 Ω to 8 Ω.

=== Microphones ===
There are a large number of different types of microphone and there are correspondingly large differences in impedance between them. They range from the very low impedance of ribbon microphones (can be less than one ohm) to the very large impedance of piezoelectric microphones which are measured in megohms. The Electronic Industries Alliance (EIA) has defined a number of standard microphone nominal impedances to aid categorisation of microphones.

Range (Ω)	EIA nominal impedance (Ω)
20–80	38
80–300	150
300–1250	600
1250–4500	2400
4500-20,000	9600
20,000–70,000	40,000

The International Electrotechnical Commission defines a similar set of nominal impedances, but also has a coarser classification of low (less than 600 Ω), medium (600 Ω to 10 kΩ) and high (more than 10 kΩ) impedances.

== Oscilloscopes ==
Oscilloscope inputs are usually high impedance so that they only minimally affect the circuit being measured when connected. However, the input impedance is made a specific nominal value, rather than arbitrarily high, because of the common use of X10 probes. A common value for oscilloscope nominal impedance is 1 MΩ resistance and 20 pF capacitance. With a known input impedance to the oscilloscope, the probe designer can ensure that the probe input impedance is exactly ten times this figure (actually oscilloscope plus probe cable impedance). Since the impedance included the input capacitance and the probe is an impedance divider circuit, the result is that the waveform being measured is not distorted by the RC circuit formed by the probe resistance and the capacitance of the input (or the cable capacitance which is generally higher).

== Bibliography ==
- Glen Ballou, Handbook for Sound Engineers, Gulf Professional Publishing, 2005 ISBN 0-240-80758-8.
- John Bird, Electrical Circuit Theory and Technology, Elsevier, 2007 ISBN 0-7506-8139-X.
- Gary Breed, "There's nothing magic about 50 ohms", High Frequency Electronics, pp. 6–7, June 2007, Summit Technical Media LLC, archived 26 June 2015.
- Wai-Kai Chen, The Electrical Engineering Handbook, Academic Press, 2005 ISBN 0-12-170960-4.
- Walter S. Ciciora, Modern Cable Television Technology: Video, Voice, and Data Communications, Morgan Kaufmann, 2004 ISBN 1-55860-828-1.
- Gary Davis, Ralph Jones, The Sound Reinforcement Handbook, Hal Leonard Corporation, 1989 ISBN 0-88188-900-8.
- John M. Eargle, Chris Foreman, Audio engineering for Sound Reinforcement, Hal Leonard Corporation, 2002, ISBN 0-634-04355-2.
- John Michael Golio, The RF and Microwave Handbook, CRC Press, 2001 ISBN 0-8493-8592-X.
- Rudolf F. Graf, Modern Dictionary of Electronics, Newnes, 1999 ISBN 0-7506-9866-7.
- R.R. Gulati, Modern Television Practice Principles, Technology and Servicing, New Age International, ISBN 81-224-1360-9.
- John D. Heys, Practical Wire Antennas, Radio Society of Great Britain, 1989 ISBN 0-900612-87-8.
- Ian Hickman, Oscilloscopes: How to Use Them, How They Work, Newnes, 2001 ISBN 0-7506-4757-4.
- Stephen Lampen, Wire, Cable and Fiber Optics for Video and Audio Engineers, McGraw-Hill 1997 ISBN 0-07-038134-8.
- A.K.Maini, Electronic Projects For Beginners, Pustak Mahal, 1997 ISBN 81-223-0152-5.
- Nicholas M. Maslin, HF Communications: a Systems Approach, CRC Press, 1987 ISBN 0-273-02675-5.
- Thomas Henry O'Dell, Circuits for Electronic Instrumentation, Cambridge University Press, 1991 ISBN 0-521-40428-2.
- R. Tummala, E. J. Rymaszewski (ed), Alan G. Klopfenstein, Microelectronics Packaging Handbook, Volume 3, Springer, 1997 ISBN 0-412-08451-1.
- Ron Schmitt, Electromagnetics Explained: a Handbook for Wireless/RF, EMC, and High-speed Electronics, Newnes, 2002 ISBN 0-7506-7403-2.
- Scott Hunter Stark, Live Sound Reinforcement: a Comprehensive Guide to P.A. and Music Reinforcement Systems and Technology, Hal Leonard Corporation, 1996 ISBN 0-918371-07-4.
- John Vasey, Concert Sound and Lighting Systems, Focal Press, 1999 ISBN 0-240-80364-7.
- Menno van der Veen, Modern High-end Valve Amplifiers: Based on Toroidal Output Transformers, Elektor International Media, 1999 ISBN 0-905705-63-7.
- Jerry C. Whitaker, Television Receivers, McGraw-Hill Professional, 2001 ISBN 0-07-138042-6.
