= Band rejection =

Phenomenon where a range of frequencies is lost from a source signal

Band rejection is a phenomenon in waveform signals, where a certain frequency or range of frequencies are lost or removed from a source signal.

The term band rejection, when used in electronic signal processing, refers to the deliberate removal of a known frequency range - for instance, to compensate for a known source of interference (such as noise from mains (household) electricity). A specific frequency is removed using a notch filter.

In most other senses, band rejection is the unintentional loss of signal caused by imperfections in the recording, storage or reproduction of a waveform.

== See also ==
- Band-stop filter
- Passband
- Stopband
