= George Ashley Campbell =

American electrical engineer

- Born: November 27, 1870; Hastings, Minnesota, U.S.
- Died: November 10, 1954 (aged 83)
- Education: Harvard University; MIT
- Spouse: Caroline Gillis Sawyer
- Awards: IEEE Medal of Honor (1936); IEEE Edison Medal (1940); Elliott Cresson Medal (1940)
- Scientific career
- Fields: Electrical engineering

George Ashley Campbell (November 27, 1870 – November 10, 1954) was an American engineer. He was a pioneer in developing and applying quantitative mathematical methods to the problems of long-distance telegraphy and telephony. His most important contributions were to the theory and implementation of the use of loading coils and the first wave filters designed to what was to become known as the image method. Both these areas of work resulted in important economic advantages for the American Telephone and Telegraph Company (AT&T).

== Education ==
Campbell was educated at the McCollom Institute in New Hampshire and then at MIT, where he graduated in 1891. He then received a master's degree from Harvard University in 1893. He was awarded a fellowship which enabled him to spend three years on graduate work; one year studying advanced mathematics under Felix Klein at Göttingen, one year studying electricity and mechanics under Ludwig Boltzmann in Vienna, and one year studying under Henri Poincaré in Paris. Campbell received a doctorate from Harvard in 1901 with his dissertation being on the subject of his loading coil research at AT&T.

== Work on loading coils ==
In 1897 Campbell went to work for AT&T in Boston. He developed a method for transmitting analog telephony over much greater distances than had previously been possible by the insertion of loading coils into the line at carefully calculated intervals to increase the inductance. Engineer Michael I. Pupin also patented a similar system and AT&T paid Pupin a very large sum for his patents, so that development would continue without a legal battle. In fact, neither man was the first to suggest the idea of loading coils, that credit goes to Oliver Heaviside in an 1887 article. Heaviside, however, never patented the idea; indeed, he took no commercial advantage of any of his brilliant work. Despite the rather arcane legal arguments surrounding this, it is unquestionable that Campbell was the first to actually construct a telephone circuit using loading coils.

Campbell was aware of Heaviside's work in discovering the Heaviside condition, in which the specification for distortionless transmission of signals is formulated, but apparently was not aware of Heaviside's suggestion of using loading coils to force a line to meet it. Campbell initially attacked the problem from a completely different basis. Campbell was tasked by AT&T to investigate the possibility of improving line quality with the use of iron-copper bimetallic cable invented by John S. Stone, another AT&T engineer. This cable of Stone's would similarly increase line inductance and had the potential to meet the Heaviside condition. However, Campbell was struggling to set up a practical demonstration over a real telephone route with the budget he had been allocated. After considering that his artificial line simulators used lumped components rather than the distributed quantities found in a real line, he wondered if he could not insert the inductance with lumped components instead of using Stone's distributed line. When his calculations showed that the manholes on telephone routes were sufficiently close together to be able to insert the loading coils without the expense of either having to dig up the route or lay in new cables he changed to this new plan. The very first demonstration of loading coils on a telephone cable was on a 46-mile length of the so-called Pittsburgh cable (the test was actually in Boston, the cable had previously been used for testing in Pittsburgh) on September 6, 1899, carried out by Campbell himself and his assistant. The first telephone cable using loaded lines put into public service was between Jamaica Plain and West Newton just outside of Boston on May 18, 1900.

=== Legal battle ===
AT&T fought a legal battle with Pupin over his claim. Pupin was first to patent but Campbell had already conducted practical demonstrations before Pupin had even filed his patent (December 1899), Campbell's delay in filing being due to the slow internal machinations of AT&T. The claim Pupin makes in his autobiography that he had previously thought of the idea while climbing a mountain in 1894 is widely doubted and there is no evidence for this either documentary or in the subsequent activities of Pupin and his students. However, AT&T foolishly deleted from Campbell's proposed patent application all the tables and graphs detailing the exact value of inductance that would be required before the patent was submitted. Since Pupin's patent contained a (less accurate) formula, AT&T was open to claims of incomplete disclosure. Fearing that there was a risk that the battle would end with the invention being declared unpatentable (due to Heaviside's prior work), they decided to buy an option on Pupin's patent for a yearly fee so that AT&T would control both patents. By January 1901 Pupin had been paid $200,000 (equivalent to $6,000,000 in 2024) and by 1917, when the AT&T monopoly ended and payments ceased, he had received a total of $455,000 (equivalent to $11,330,000 in 2024).

The invention was of enormous value to AT&T. Telephone cables could now be used to twice the distance previously possible, or alternatively, a cable of half the previous quality (and cost) could be used over the same distance. When considering whether to allow Campbell to go ahead with the demonstration, their engineers had estimated that they stood to save $700,000 (equivalent to $22,200,000 in 2024) in new installation costs in New York and New Jersey alone. It has been estimated that AT&T saved $100 million (3.18 billion in 2024) in the first quarter of the 20th century. Heaviside, who began it all, came away with nothing. He was offered a token payment but would not accept, wanting the credit for his work rather than money. He remarked ironically that if his prior publication had been admitted it would "interfere...with the flow of dollars in the proper direction...".

== Work on filters ==
One of the important results of the work on loading coils was that the loading caused a cut-off at a definite frequency in the line response, whose value could be predicted with a knowledge of the line capacitance and coil inductance and the spacing between coils. An unloaded continuous line has no such behavior, the attenuation simply steadily increased with frequency. This behavior, and the lumped-element networks being used to create artificial lines for test purposes, suggested to Campbell a possible topology for a filter with similar characteristics.

This work on filtering was begun in 1910. Using a ladder network of inductors and capacitors in appropriate configurations he produced low-pass, high-pass and band-pass filters. These filters could be designed to pass frequencies in any specified range and reject those in other ranges. This class of filter was later to be dubbed the constant k filter by Otto Zobel working for AT&T in New York.

The sharpness of transition from the passband to the stopband, and the depth of rejection in the stopband were determined by the number of sections in the ladder. If a tighter specification was required for the filter, all that was necessary was to add more inductors and capacitors to the ladder in exactly the same circuit configuration as those for a less stringent specification.

The purpose of filtering a telephone channel so precisely was that AT&T were attempting to use the same wires for many telephone conversations simultaneously using the technique of frequency division multiplexing (FDM) and it was important for reasons of privacy, as well as intelligibility, that there was no crosstalk between the channels. Filters were also required to separate out the various conversations at the far end of the cable. Initially, a passband of 200 Hz to 2.5 kHz was used for the voice baseband, but soon the International Telecommunication Union (ITU) established the world standard of 300 Hz to 3.4 kHz with 4 kHz spacing between channels.

These filter designs, which Zobel was later to improve upon, were of great economic value to AT&T. The ability to send multiple conversations over the same wires resulted in very substantial savings in cable installation costs. The modulation system used (single-sideband suppressed-carrier transmission) and the ITU standard remained the primary method of telephone service distribution until it began to be supplanted by digital techniques from the 1980s onwards.

== Publications ==
- Campbell, George Ashley (1903) [1901-06-07]. "Chapter XXX. On loaded lines in telephonic transmission" (PDF). The London, Edinburgh, and Dublin Philosophical Magazine and Journal of Science. Series 6. 5 (27). Taylor & Francis: 313–330. doi:10.1080/14786440309462928. Archived (PDF) from the original on 2023-07-16. (2+18 pages)
- Campbell, George Ashley (April 1911). "Cisoidal oscillations" (PDF). Proceedings of the American Institute of Electrical Engineers. XXX (1–6). American Institute of Electrical Engineers: 789–824 [Fig. 13 on p. 810]. doi:10.1109/PAIEE.1911.6659711. S2CID 51647814. (37 pages) (NB. Includes an early graphical depiction of something similar to a Smith chart decades before Tōsaku Mizuhashi (水橋東作), Amiel Rafailovich Volpert (Амиэ́ль Р. Во́льперт) and Phillip H. Smith published their works.)
- Campbell, George Ashley (November 1922). "Physical Theory of the Electric Wave-Filter". The Bell System Technical Journal. I (2). New York, USA: American Telephone and Telegraph Company: 1–32.
- Fourier integrals for practical applications (1931)

== See also ==
=== People ===
- Oliver Heaviside
- John Stone Stone
- Mihajlo Idvorski Pupin
- Otto Julius Zobel

=== Circuits ===
- Loading coil
- Constant k filter

=== Theory ===
- Cisoidal oscillation
- Heaviside condition
- Image impedance

=== Multiplexing terms ===
- Multiplexed
- Frequency division multiplex
- Single sideband

=== Filtering terms ===
- Low-pass filter
- High-pass filter
- Band-pass filter
- Passband
- Stopband
