= Artificial transmission line =

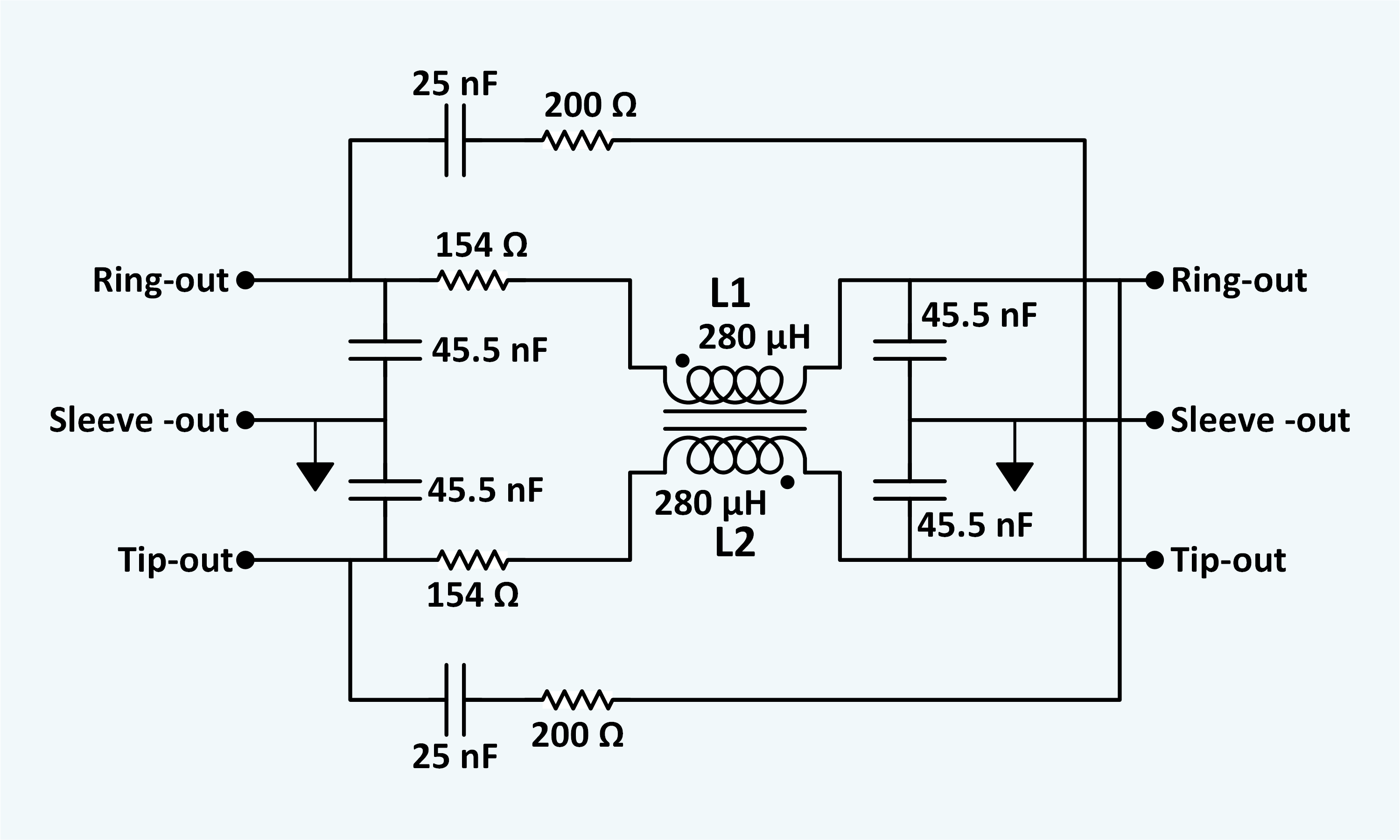
Schematic of an artificial telephone line section for 6000 feet of 24 gauge twisted pair. L1 and L2 are effectively in series giving 1.12 mH of series inductance.

In telecommunications, an artificial transmission line is a two-port electrical network that has the characteristic impedance, transmission time delay, phase shift, or other parameter(s) of a real transmission line. It can be used to simulate a real transmission line in one or more of these respects.

Early artificial lines were used in telephony research and took the form of a cascade of lattice phase equalisers to provide the necessary delay. The lattice phase circuit was invented by Otto Zobel in the 1920s.
