= Stopband =

Band of frequencies between specified limits

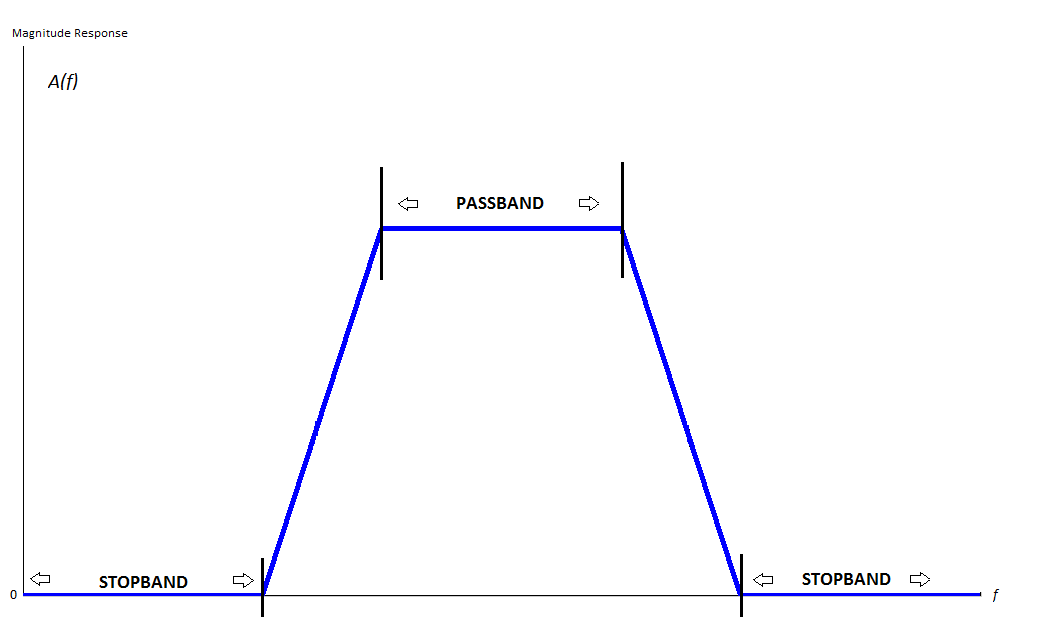
Frequency response of an example bandpass filter. The frequencies between a stopband and a passband define the transition band.

A stopband is a band of frequencies, between specified limits, through which a circuit, such as a filter or telephone circuit, does not allow signals to pass, or the attenuation is above the required stopband attenuation level. Depending on application, the required attenuation within the stopband may typically be a value between 20 and 120 dB higher than the nominal passband attenuation, which often is 0 dB.

The lower and upper limiting frequencies, also denoted lower and upper stopband corner frequencies, are the frequencies where the stopband and the transition bands meet in a filter specification. The stopband of a low-pass filter is the frequencies from the stopband corner frequency (which is slightly higher than the passband 3 dB cut-off frequency) up to the infinite frequency. The stopband of a high-pass filter consists of the frequencies from 0 hertz to a stopband corner frequency (slightly lower than the passband cut-off frequency).

A band-stop filter has one stopband, specified by two non-zero and non-infinite corner frequencies. The difference between the limits in the band-stop filter is the stopband bandwidth, which usually is expressed in hertz.

A bandpass filter typically has two stopbands. The shape factor of a bandpass filter is the relationship between the 3 dB bandwidth, and the difference between the stopband limits.

== See also ==
- Passband
- Band-stop filter
- Band gap in solid state physics
- Band rejection
