= Equalization filter =

Equalization filter may refer to:

- A filter for audio equalization
- A filter for communications equalization

== See also ==
- Analogue filter
- Audio filter
- Electronic filter
