= Frequency-dependent negative resistor =

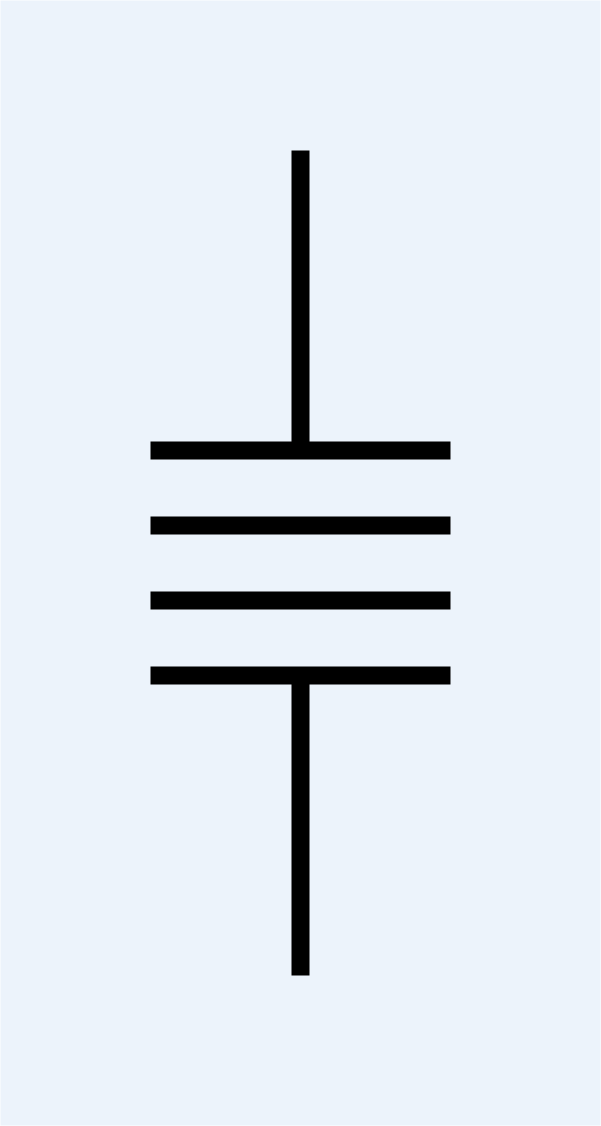
The electronic symbol for a frequency-dependent negative resistor. The symbol is intended to evoke a double capacitor.

A frequency-dependent negative resistor (FDNR) is a circuit element that exhibits a purely real negative resistance −1/(ω^{2}kC) that decreases in magnitude at a rate of −40 dB per decade. The element is used in implementation of low-pass active filters modeled from ladder filters. The element is usually implemented from a generalized impedance converter (GIC) or gyrator. The impedance of a FDNR is

$$Z = \frac{1}{s^2 k C}$$

or

$$Z = \frac{-1}{\omega^2 k C},$$

when s = jω.

The concept of frequency-dependent negative resistors was introduced by L. T. Bruton and is expounded upon within several chapters of his book. They are also discussed in Temes & LaPatra, Chen and Wait, Huelsman & Korn.

== Application ==
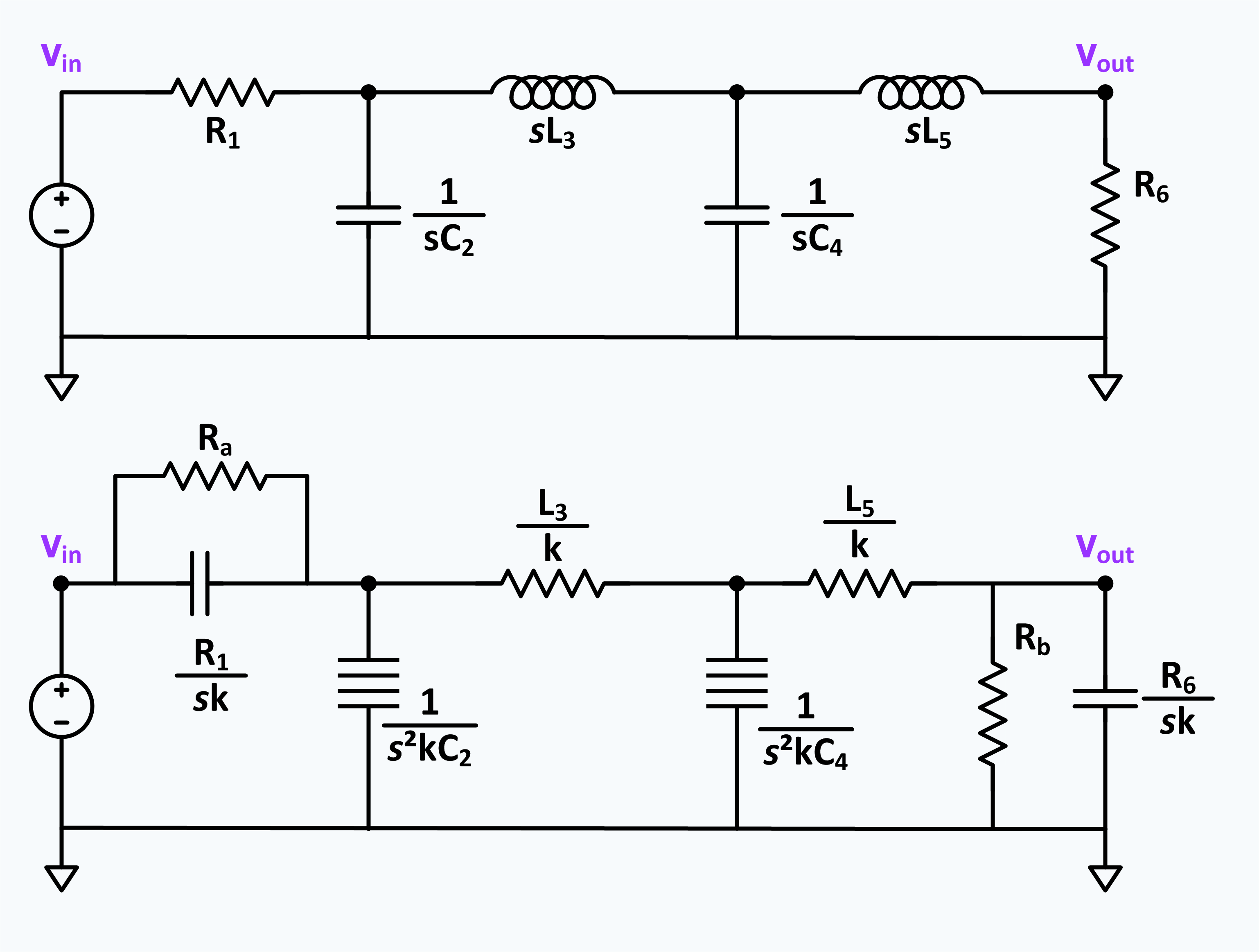
A low pass ladder filter and an implementation using frequency dependent negative resistors (FDNR). Ra and Rb are added for practical reasons.

If all the impedances (including the source and load impedances) of a passive ladder filter are divided by sk, the transfer function is not changed. The effect of this division is to transform resistors into capacitors, inductors into resistors and capacitors into FDNRs. The purpose of this transformation is to eliminate inductors which are often problematic components. This technique is especially useful when all the capacitors are grounded. If the technique is applied to capacitors that are not grounded, the resulting FDNRs are floating (neither end is grounded), which in practice, can be difficult to stabilize.

The resulting circuit requires practical considerations because FDNR lowpass filters require a DC path to ground. The DC transfer function of the analog prototype filter has a value of (R_{6})/(R_{1} + R_{6}) whereas the transformed ladder filter realizes the DC transfer gain as the ratio of two capacitors. In the ideal case, this is valid, but in the practical case there is always some, usually unpredictable, finite leakage resistance in the capacitors so that the actual DC performance of the transformed ladder is unpredictable. R_{a} and R_{b} are added to the circuit to mitigate these problems. If R_{b}/(R_{a} + R_{b} + L_{3}/k + L_{5}/k) = (R_{6})/(R_{1} + R_{6}) then the DC gain of the transformed circuit is the same as the predecessor circuit. Finally, if R_{a} and R_{b} are large with respect to the other resistors there is little effect on the filter's transition band and high frequency behavior.

== Implementation ==
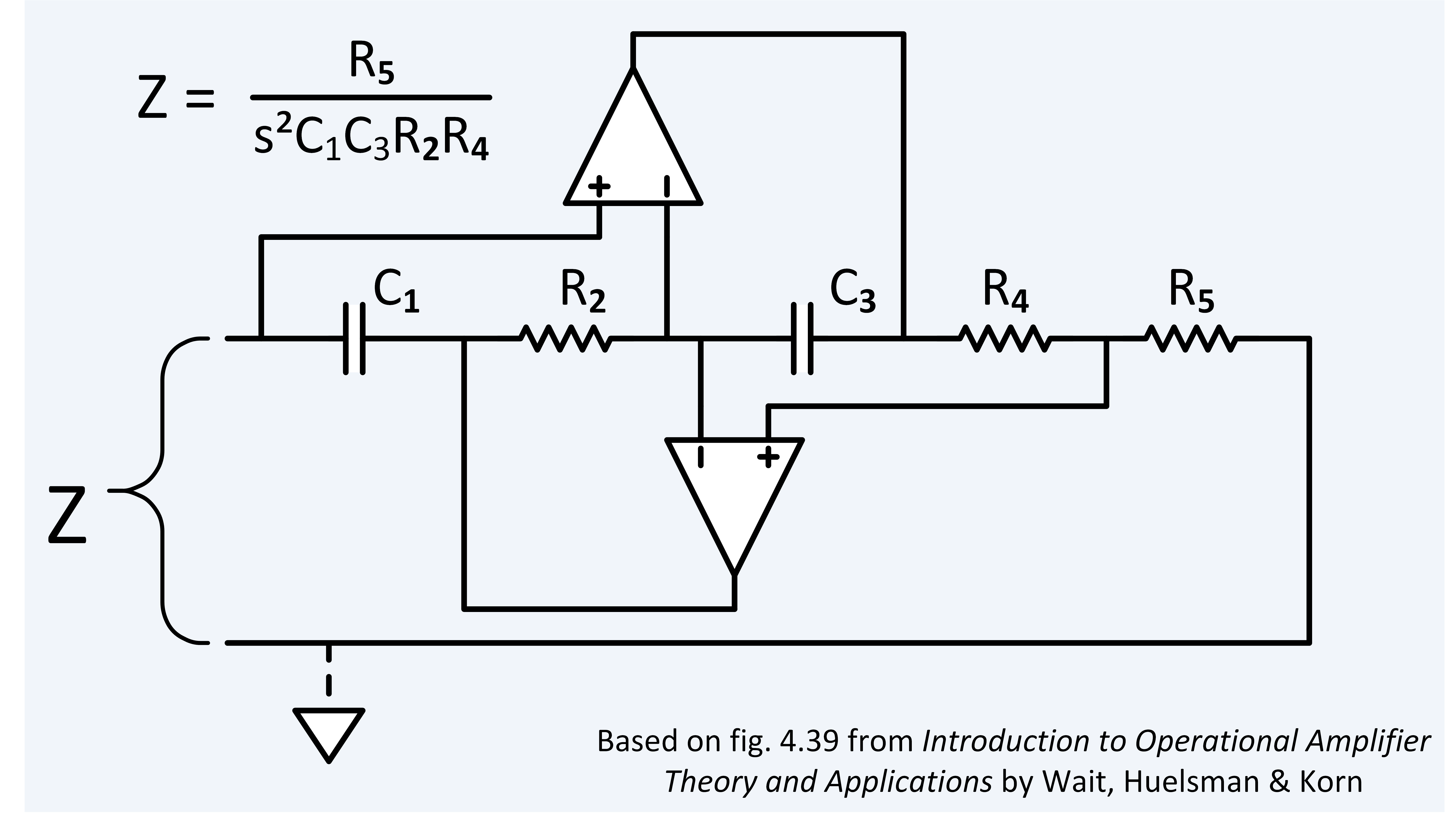
Schematic of a frequency dependent negative resistor.

Wait gives the circuit shown to the right as suitable for a grounded FDNR.
