= KHN =

KHN may refer to

- Knoop hardness number
- Kerwin-Huelsman-Newcomb, a type of electronic filter
- IATA code of Nanchang Changbei International Airport, in Jiangxi province, China
- Kaiser Health News
- Kettering Health Network
- Kraken Hockey Network, a television network for Seattle Kraken games
