= Roll-off =

Feature of filter frequency response

Roll-off is the steepness of a transfer function with frequency, particularly in electrical network analysis, and most especially in connection with filter circuits in the transition between a passband and a stopband. It is most typically applied to the insertion loss of the network, but can, in principle, be applied to any relevant function of frequency, and any technology, not just electronics. It is usual to measure roll-off as a function of logarithmic frequency; consequently, the units of roll-off are either decibels per decade (dB/decade), where a decade is a tenfold increase in frequency, or decibels per octave (dB/8ve), where an octave is a twofold increase in frequency.

The concept of roll-off stems from the fact that in many networks roll-off tends towards a constant gradient at frequencies well away from the cut-off point of the frequency curve. Roll-off enables the cut-off performance of such a filter network to be reduced to a single number. Note that roll-off can occur with decreasing frequency as well as increasing frequency, depending on the bandform of the filter being considered: for instance a low-pass filter will roll-off with increasing frequency, but a high-pass filter or the lower stopband of a band-pass filter will roll-off with decreasing frequency. For brevity, this article describes only low-pass filters. This is to be taken in the spirit of prototype filters; the same principles may be applied to high-pass filters by interchanging phrases such as "above cut-off frequency" and "below cut-off frequency".

== First-order roll-off ==
First-order RC filter low-pass filter circuit.

Roll-off of a first-order low-pass filter is 20 dB/decade (≈6 dB/octave)

A simple first-order network such as a RC circuit will have a roll-off of 20 dB/decade. This is a little over 6 dB/octave and is the more usual description given for this roll-off. This can be shown to be so by considering the voltage transfer function, A, of the RC network:

$$A=\frac{V_o}{V_i}=\frac{1}{1+i\omega RC}$$

Frequency scaling this to ω_{c} = 1/RC = 1 and forming the power ratio gives,

$$|A|^2=\frac{1}{1+\left( {\omega \over \omega_c} \right)^2} = \frac{1}{1+\omega^2}$$

In decibels this becomes,

$$10\log \left({\frac{1}{1+\omega^2}}\right)$$

or expressed as a loss,

$$L=10\log \left({1+\omega^2}\right) \ \mathrm{dB}$$

At frequencies well above ω=1, this simplifies to,

$$L \approx 10\log \left(\omega^2\right)= 20\log \omega \ \mathrm{dB}$$

Roll-off is given by,

$$\Delta L = 20\log \left( {\omega_2 \over \omega_1} \right) \ \mathrm{dB/interval_{2,1}}$$

For a decade this is;

$$\Delta L = 20\log 10 = 20 \ \mathrm{dB/decade}$$

and for an octave,

$$\Delta L = 20\log 2 \approx 6.0206 \ \mathrm{dB/8ve}$$

== Higher order networks ==
Multiple order RC filter buffered between stages.

Roll-off graph of higher-order low-pass filters showing various rates of roll-off

A higher order network can be constructed by cascading first-order sections together. If a unity gain buffer amplifier is placed between each section (or some other active topology is used) there is no interaction between the stages. In that circumstance, for n identical first-order sections in cascade, the voltage transfer function of the complete network is given by;

$$A_{\mathrm T}=A^n \$$

consequently, the total roll-off is given by,

$$\Delta L_\text{T} = n \, \Delta L = 20n \text{ dB/decade} \approx 6n \text{ dB/octave}$$

A similar effect can be achieved in the digital domain by repeatedly applying the same filtering algorithm to the signal.

LC low-pass ladder circuit. Each element (that is L or C) adds an order to the filter and a pole to the driving point impedance.

The calculation of transfer function becomes somewhat more complicated when the sections are not all identical, or when the popular ladder topology construction is used to realise the filter. In a ladder filter each section of the filter has an effect on its immediate neighbours and a lesser effect on more remote sections so the response is not a simple A^{n} even when all the sections are identical. For some filter classes, such as the Butterworth filter, the insertion loss is still monotonically increasing with frequency and quickly asymptotically converges to a roll-off of 20n dB/decade, but in others, such as the Chebyshev or elliptic filter the roll-off near the cut-off frequency is much faster and elsewhere the response is anything but monotonic. Nevertheless, all filter classes eventually converge to a roll-off of 20n dB/decade theoretically at some arbitrarily high frequency, but in many applications this will occur in a frequency band of no interest to the application and parasitic effects may well start to dominate long before this happens.

== Applications ==
Filters with a high roll-off were first developed to prevent crosstalk between adjacent channels on telephone FDM systems. Roll-off is also significant on audio loudspeaker crossover filters: here the need is not so much for a high roll-off but that the roll-offs of the high frequency and low-frequency sections are symmetrical and complementary. An unusual need for high roll-off arises in EEG machines. Here the filters mostly make do with a basic 20 dB/decade roll-off, however, some instruments provide a switchable 35 Hz filter at the high frequency end with a faster roll-off to help filter out noise generated by muscle activity.

== See also ==
- Bode plot
