= Electronic filter topology =

Electronic filter circuits defined by component connection

Electronic filter topology defines electronic filter circuits without taking note of the values of the components used but only the manner in which those components are connected.

Filter design characterises filter circuits primarily by their transfer function rather than their topology. Transfer functions may be linear or nonlinear. Common types of linear filter transfer function are; high-pass, low-pass, bandpass, band-reject or notch and all-pass. Once the transfer function for a filter is chosen, the particular topology to implement such a prototype filter can be selected so that, for example, one might choose to design a Butterworth filter using the Sallen–Key topology.

Filter topologies may be divided into passive and active types. Passive topologies are composed exclusively of passive components: resistors, capacitors, and inductors. Active topologies also include active components (such as transistors, op amps, and other integrated circuits) that require power. Further, topologies may be implemented either in unbalanced form or else in balanced form when employed in balanced circuits. Implementations such as electronic mixers and stereo sound may require arrays of identical circuits.

== Passive topologies ==
Passive filters have been long in development and use. Most are built from simple two-port networks called "sections". There is no formal definition of a section except that it must have at least one series component and one shunt component. Sections are invariably connected in a "cascade" or "daisy-chain" topology, consisting of additional copies of the same section or of completely different sections. The rules of series and parallel impedance would combine two sections consisting only of series components or shunt components into a single section.

Some passive filters, consisting of only one or two filter sections, are given special names including the L-section, T-section and Π-section, which are unbalanced filters, and the C-section, H-section and box-section, which are balanced. All are built upon a very simple "ladder" topology (see below). The chart at the bottom of the page shows these various topologies in terms of general constant k filters.

Filters designed using network synthesis usually repeat the simplest form of L-section topology though component values may change in each section. Image designed filters, on the other hand, keep the same basic component values from section to section though the topology may vary and tend to make use of more complex sections.

L-sections are never symmetrical but two L-sections back-to-back form a symmetrical topology and many other sections are symmetrical in form.

=== Ladder topologies ===
Ladder topology, often called Cauer topology after Wilhelm Cauer (inventor of the elliptic filter), was in fact first used by George Campbell (inventor of the constant k filter). Campbell published in 1922 but had clearly been using the topology for some time before this. Cauer first picked up on ladders (published 1926) inspired by the work of Foster (1924). There are two forms of basic ladder topologies: unbalanced and balanced. Cauer topology is usually thought of as an unbalanced ladder topology.

A ladder network consists of cascaded asymmetrical L-sections (unbalanced) or C-sections (balanced). In low pass form the topology would consist of series inductors and shunt capacitors. Other bandforms would have an equally simple topology transformed from the lowpass topology. The transformed network will have shunt admittances that are dual networks of the series impedances if they were duals in the starting network - which is the case with series inductors and shunt capacitors. Ladder filters were often implemented with crystal resonators for steeper transition.

Image filter sections

Unbalanced
L Half section	T Section	Π Section
Ladder network

Balanced
C Half-section	H Section	Box Section
Ladder network
X Section (mid-T-Derived)		X Section (mid-Π-Derived)

N.B.	Textbooks and design drawings usually show the unbalanced implementations, but in telecoms it is often required to convert the design to the balanced implementation when used with balanced lines.

=== Modified ladder topologies ===
series m-derived topology

Image filter design commonly uses modifications of the basic ladder topology. These topologies, invented by Otto Zobel, have the same passbands as the ladder on which they are based but their transfer functions are modified to improve some parameter such as impedance matching, stopband rejection or passband-to-stopband transition steepness. Usually the design applies some transform to a simple ladder topology: the resulting topology is ladder-like but no longer obeys the rule that shunt admittances are the dual network of series impedances: it invariably becomes more complex with higher component count. Such topologies include;

- m-derived filter
- mm'-type filter
- General m_{n}-type filter

The m-type (m-derived) filter is by far the most commonly used modified image ladder topology. There are two m-type topologies for each of the basic ladder topologies; the series-derived and shunt-derived topologies. These have identical transfer functions to each other but different image impedances. Where a filter is being designed with more than one passband, the m-type topology will result in a filter where each passband has an analogous frequency-domain response. It is possible to generalise the m-type topology for filters with more than one passband using parameters m_{1}, m_{2}, m_{3} etc., which are not equal to each other resulting in general m_{n}-type filters which have bandforms that can differ in different parts of the frequency spectrum.

The mm'-type topology can be thought of as a double m-type design. Like the m-type it has the same bandform but offers further improved transfer characteristics. It is, however, a rarely used design due to increased component count and complexity as well as its normally requiring basic ladder and m-type sections in the same filter for impedance matching reasons. It is normally only found in a composite filter.

=== Bridged-T topologies ===
Typical bridged-T Zobel network equaliser used to correct high end roll-off

Zobel constant resistance filters use a topology that is somewhat different from other filter types, distinguished by having a constant input resistance at all frequencies and in that they use resistive components in the design of their sections. The higher component and section count of these designs usually limits their use to equalisation applications. Topologies usually associated with constant resistance filters are the bridged-T and its variants, all described in the Zobel network article;

- Bridged-T topology
- Balanced bridged-T topology
- Open-circuit L-section topology
- Short-circuit L-section topology
- Balanced open-circuit C-section topology
- Balanced short-circuit C-section topology

The bridged-T topology is also used in sections intended to produce a signal delay but in this case no resistive components are used in the design.

=== Lattice topology ===
Lattice topology X-section phase correction filter

A lattice section is a four-arm bridge network, commonly drawn in the form of an X. It provides two balanced signal paths between the input and output. By selecting the impedances in opposing arms, signals may reinforce one another over one range of frequencies and cancel over another.

T-sections and bridged-T sections can be transformed into equivalent lattice sections. The reverse transformation is not always possible with passive components, because the resulting circuit may require negative values of inductance or capacitance.

A major application of lattice sections is in all-pass filters used for phase equalisation. Lattice circuits were also important in early crystal filters. Matched crystal resonators were placed in opposing arms so that their series and parallel resonances produced a passband between regions of high attenuation. Wider-band crystal lattice filters combined the crystals with inductors and capacitors and were used in carrier-telephone and radio equipment.

The term lattice usually refers to the balanced X-shaped representation of the network. Topologically it is a form of bridge circuit; the distinction is largely one of terminology and how the circuit is drawn.

== Active topologies ==
=== Elementary feedback topology ===
The elementary feedback topology is based on the simple inverting amplifier configuration. The transfer function is:

$$H(s) = \frac{V_o}{V_i} = - { Z_2 \over Z_1 }$$

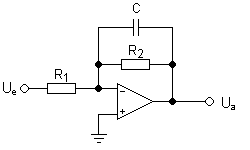
An elementary filter topology introduces a capacitor into the feedback path of an op-amp to achieve an unbalanced active implementation of a low-pass transfer function

=== Multiple feedback topology ===
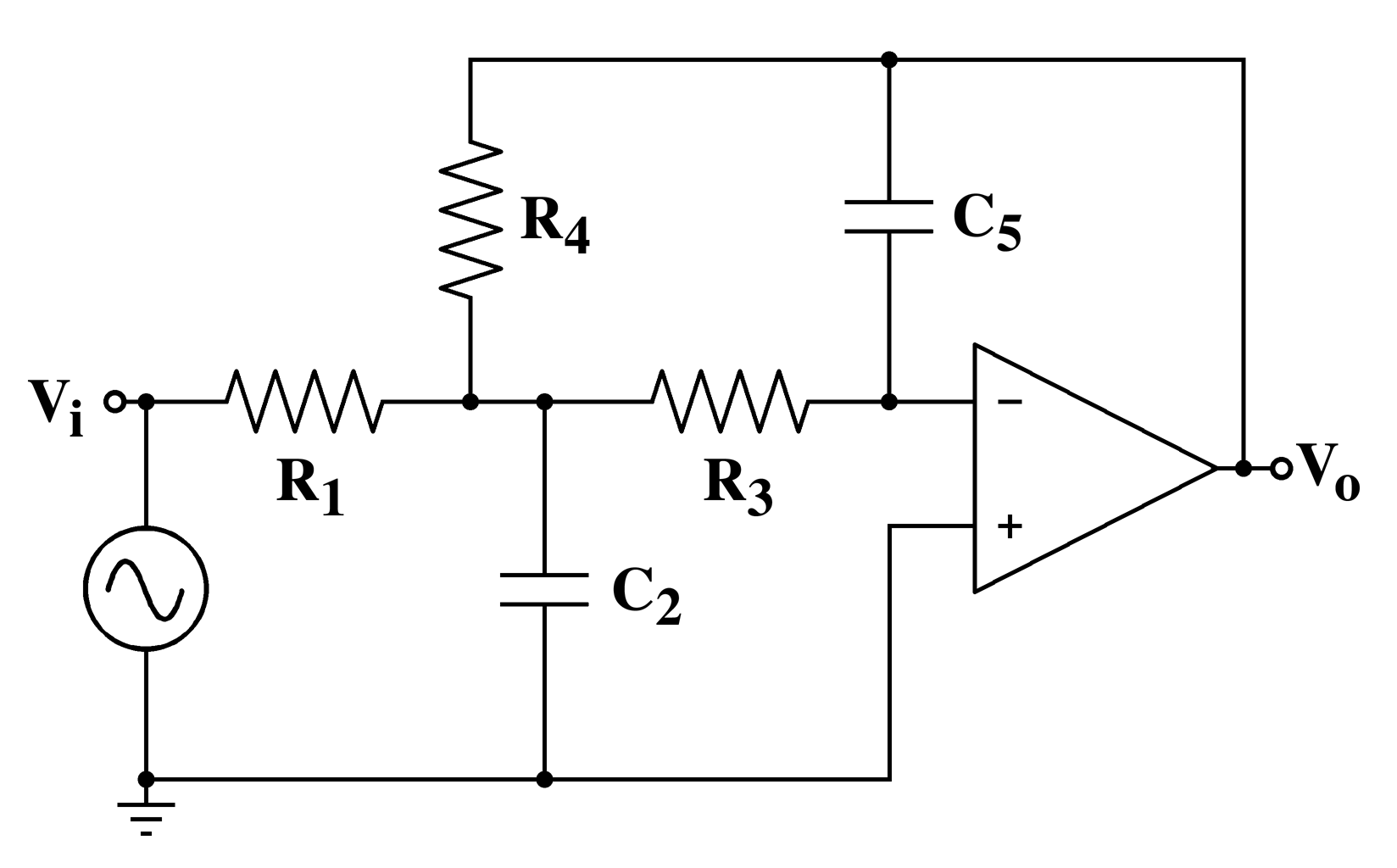
Multiple feedback topology circuit.

Multiple feedback topology is an electronic filter topology which is used to implement an electronic filter by adding two poles to the transfer function. A diagram of the circuit topology for a second order low pass filter is shown in the figure on the right.

==== Lowpass ====
The transfer function of the lowpass multiple feedback topology circuit, like all second-order lowpass linear filters, is:

$$H(s) = \frac{V_o}{V_i} = -\frac{1}{As^2+Bs+C} = \frac{K {\omega_n}^2}{s^{2}+\frac{\omega_{n}}{Q}s+{\omega_n}^2}$$.

In an MF lowpass filter,

$$A = R_1 R_3 C_2 C_5\,$$
$$B = R_3 C_5 + R_1 C_5 + R_1 R_3 C_5/R_4\,$$
$$C = R_1/R_4\,$$

$Q = \frac{ \sqrt{R_3 R_4 C_2 C_5} }{ ( R_4 + R_3 + |K| R_3 ) C_5 }$ is the quality factor.
$K = -R_4/R_1\,$ is the DC voltage gain
$\omega_{n} = 2 \pi f_{n} = \frac{1}{ \sqrt{R_3 R_4 C_2 C_5}}$ is the natural frequency

and, provided $Q >= \frac{1}{\sqrt{2}}$

$\omega_{c} = \omega_{n}\sqrt{1-1/(2Q^2)+\sqrt{2-1/Q^2+1/(4Q^4)}}$ is the cutoff frequency
$\omega_{r} = 2 \pi f_{r} = \omega_{n}\sqrt{1-\frac{1}{2Q^2}}$ is the resonant frequency
$M_{r} = \frac{2Q^2}{\sqrt{4Q^2-1}}$ is the gain peaking at resonance.

==== Highpass ====
The transfer function of the highpass multiple feedback topology circuit, like all second-order highpass linear filters, interchanging R and C throughout in the schematic above, is:

$$H(s) = \frac{V_o}{V_i} = -\frac{s^2}{As^2+Bs+C} = \frac{K s^2}{s^{2}+\frac{\omega_{n}}{Q}s+{\omega_n}^2}$$.

In an MF highpass filter, ignoring the scalar gain factor K:

$$A=1\,$$
$$B= \frac{C_1+C_3+C_4}{R_5 C_3 C_4}\,$$
$$C = \frac{1}{R_2 R_5C_3 C_4}\,$$

$Q = \frac{\sqrt{C_3 C_4 R_2 R_5}}{(C_4+C_3+|K|C_3)R_5}$ is the quality factor
$K = -C_1/C_4\,$ is the HF voltage gain
$\omega_{n} = 2 \pi f_{n} = \frac{1}{\sqrt{C_3 C_4 R_2 R_5}}$ is the natural frequency

and again, provided $Q >= \frac{1}{\sqrt{2}}$

$\omega_{c} = 2 \pi f_{c} = \frac{w_{n}}{\sqrt{1-1/(2Q^2)+\sqrt{2-1/Q^2+1/(4Q^4)}}}$ is the cutoff frequency
$\omega_{r} = 2 \pi f_{r} = \frac{\omega_{n}}{\sqrt{1-\frac{1}{2Q^2}}}$ is the resonant frequency
$M_{r} = \frac{2Q^2}{\sqrt{4Q^2-1}}$ is the gain peaking at resonance.

==== Bandpass ====
The transfer function of the bandpass multiple feedback topology circuit, like all second-order bandpass linear filters, is:

$H(s) = \frac{V_o}{V_i} = -\frac{s}{A s^2+Bs + C} = \frac{K\omega_{bw}s}{s^2+\omega_{bw}s+\omega_{c}^2}$, where

$\omega_{c}$ is the centre frequency,
$\omega_{bw}$ is the filter bandwidth at the -3 dB points, and
$Q=\frac{\omega_{c}}{\omega_{bw}}$ is the quality factor.

In an MF bandpass filter with equal capacitors C:

$$K\omega_{bw} = -\frac{1}{R_{1}C}$$
$$A=1$$
$$B=\frac{2C}{R_{3}}$$
$$C=\frac{1}{(R_{1}||R_{2})R_{3}C^2}$$

Note that although this is a 2nd-order filter, as it has two poles, the rate of attenuation either side of the centre frequency is 6 dB/octave, not 12 dB/octave, because only one of the poles is active at any given frequency.

This topology is only adequate for a narrowband bandpass filter. For a wideband bandpass filter with a flat passband it is necessary to use a lowpass and a highpass in series.

For finding suitable component values to achieve the desired filter properties, a similar approach can be followed as in the Design choices section of the alternative Sallen–Key topology.

=== Biquad filter topology ===
For the digital implementation of a biquad filter, see Digital biquad filter.

A biquad filter is a type of linear filter that implements a transfer function that is the ratio of two quadratic functions. The name biquad is short for biquadratic. Any second-order filter topology can be referred to as a biquad, such as the MFB or Sallen-Key. However, there is also a specific "biquad" topology. It is also sometimes called the 'ring of 3' circuit.

Biquad filters are typically active and implemented with a single-amplifier biquad (SAB) or two-integrator-loop topology.

- The SAB topology uses feedback to generate complex poles and possibly complex zeros. In particular, the feedback moves the real poles of an RC circuit in order to generate the proper filter characteristics.
- The two-integrator-loop topology is derived from rearranging a biquadratic transfer function. The rearrangement will equate one signal with the sum of another signal, its integral, and the integral's integral. In other words, the rearrangement reveals a state variable filter structure. By using different states as outputs, any kind of second-order filter can be implemented.

The SAB topology is sensitive to component choice and can be more difficult to adjust. Hence, usually the term biquad refers to the two-integrator-loop state variable filter topology.

==== Tow-Thomas filter ====
Figure 1. The common Tow-Thomas biquad filter topology.

For example, the basic configuration in Figure 1 can be used as either a low-pass or bandpass filter depending on where the output signal is taken from.

The second-order low-pass transfer function is given by

$$H(s)=\frac{G_\mathrm{lpf}{\omega_0}^2}{s^{2}+\frac{\omega_{0}}{Q}s+{\omega_0}^2}$$

where low-pass gain $G_\mathrm{lpf}=-R_{2}/R_{1}$. The second-order bandpass transfer function is given by

$$H(s)=\frac{G_\mathrm{bpf}\frac{\omega_{0}}{Q}s}{s^{2}+\frac{\omega_{0}}{Q}s+{\omega_0}^2}$$.

with bandpass gain $G_\mathrm{bpf}=-R_{3}/R_{1}$. In both cases, the

- Natural frequency is $\omega_{0}=1/\sqrt{R_2 R_4 C_1 C_2}$.
- Quality factor is $Q=\sqrt{\frac{{R_3}^2 C_1}{R_2 R_4 C_2}}$.

The bandwidth is approximated by $B=\omega_{0}/Q$, and Q is sometimes expressed as a damping constant $\zeta=1/2Q$. If a noninverting low-pass filter is required, the output can be taken at the output of the second operational amplifier, after the order of the second integrator and the inverter has been switched. If a noninverting bandpass filter is required, the order of the second integrator and the inverter can be switched, and the output taken at the output of the inverter's operational amplifier.

==== Akerberg-Mossberg filter ====
Figure 2. The Akerberg-Mossberg biquad filter topology.

Figure 2 shows a variant of the Tow-Thomas topology, known as Akerberg-Mossberg topology, that uses an actively compensated Miller integrator, which improves filter performance.

=== Sallen–Key topology ===
Figure 1: The generic Sallen–Key filter topology

The Sallen-Key design is a non-inverting second-order filter with the option of high Q and passband gain.

== See also ==
- Prototype filter
- Topology (electronics)
- Linear filter
- State variable filter
