= Hybrid LC Filter =

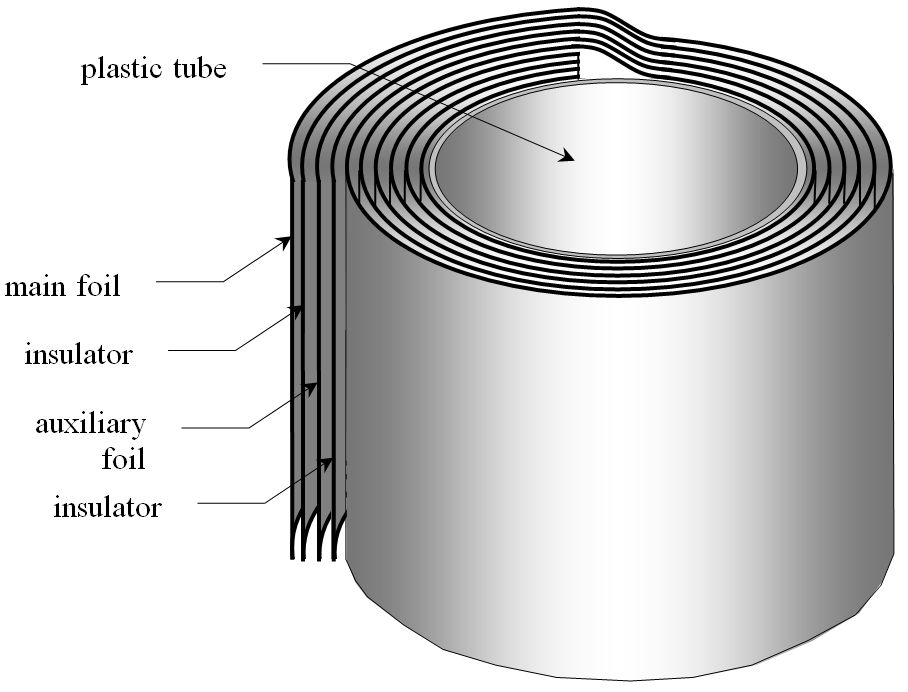
Hybrid LC filter layout. Construction contains conductive main and auxiliary layers separated by the insulation and coiled on a core.

Hybrid LC filter is a kind of electrical LC filter, which typically contains two conductive foil layers, separated by an insulation material and coiled on a core. Layers are typically made of copper or aluminum. One layer, which is placed between the voltage source, such as inverter, and a load, is called “the main foil”; this layer forms filter inductance. Another foil, called “the auxiliary foil”, is connected to a neutral potential (e.g. earth), forming the useful capacitance between foils. This way the self-capacitance of the main foil is crucially decreased. Filter is characterized by improved high-frequency performance (working frequency range is at least up to tens of MHz). The mutual inductance between foil layers is rather large, coupling factor is typically about 0.95-0.99. Higher the mutual inductance provided, better the damping properties of the hybrid LC filter.
