= Band-pass filter =

Filter that rejects signals outside a certain range

Bandwidth measured at half-power points (gain −3 dB, √2/2, or about 0.707 relative to peak) on a diagram showing magnitude transfer function versus frequency for a band-pass filter.

A medium-complexity example of a band-pass filter.

A band-pass filter or bandpass filter (BPF) is a device that passes frequencies within a certain range and attenuates frequencies outside that range. It is the inverse of a band-stop filter.

== Description ==
In electronics and signal processing, a filter is usually a two-port circuit or device which removes frequency components of a signal (an alternating voltage or current). A band-pass filter allows through components in a specified band of frequencies, called its passband but blocks components with frequencies above or below this band. This contrasts with a high-pass filter, which allows through components with frequencies above a specific frequency, and a low-pass filter, which allows through components with frequencies below a specific frequency. In digital signal processing, in which signals represented by digital numbers are processed by computer programs, a band-pass filter is a computer algorithm that performs the same function. The term band-pass filter is also used for optical filters, sheets of colored material which allow through a specific band of light frequencies, commonly used in photography and theatre lighting, and acoustic filters which allow through sound waves of a specific band of frequencies.

An example of an analogue electronic band-pass filter is an RLC circuit (a resistor–inductor–capacitor circuit). These filters can also be created by combining a low-pass filter with a high-pass filter.

A bandpass signal is a signal containing a band of frequencies not adjacent to zero frequency, such as a signal that comes out of a bandpass filter.

An ideal bandpass filter would have a completely flat passband: all frequencies within the passband would be passed to the output without amplification or attenuation, and would completely attenuate all frequencies outside the passband.

In practice, no bandpass filter is ideal. The filter does not attenuate all frequencies outside the desired frequency range completely; in particular, there is a region just outside the intended passband where frequencies are attenuated, but not rejected. This is known as the filter roll-off, and it is usually expressed in dB of attenuation per octave or decade of frequency. Generally, the design of a filter seeks to make the roll-off as narrow as possible, thus allowing the filter to perform as close as possible to its intended design. Often, this is achieved at the expense of pass-band or stop-band ripple.

The bandwidth of the filter is simply the difference between the upper and lower cutoff frequencies. The shape factor is the ratio of bandwidths measured using two different attenuation values to determine the cutoff frequency, e.g., a shape factor of 2:1 at 30/3 dB means the bandwidth measured between frequencies at 30 dB attenuation is twice that measured between frequencies at 3 dB attenuation.

== Q factor ==
A band-pass filter can be characterized by its Q factor. The Q-factor is the reciprocal of the fractional bandwidth. A high-Q filter will have a narrow passband and a low-Q filter will have a wide passband. These are respectively referred to as narrow-band and wide-band filters.

== Applications ==
Bandpass filters are widely used in wireless transmitters and receivers. The main function of such a filter in a transmitter is to limit the bandwidth of the output signal to the band allocated for the transmission. This prevents the transmitter from interfering with other stations. In a receiver, a bandpass filter allows signals within a selected range of frequencies to be heard or decoded, while preventing signals at unwanted frequencies from getting through. Signals at frequencies outside the band which the receiver is tuned at, can either saturate or damage the receiver. Additionally they can create unwanted mixing products that fall in band and interfere with the signal of interest. Wideband receivers are particularly susceptible to such interference. A bandpass filter also optimizes the signal-to-noise ratio and sensitivity of a receiver.

In both transmitting and receiving applications, well-designed bandpass filters, having the optimum bandwidth for the mode and speed of communication being used, maximize the number of signal transmitters that can exist in a system, while minimizing the interference or competition among signals.

Outside of electronics and signal processing, one example of the use of band-pass filters is in the atmospheric sciences. It is common to band-pass filter recent meteorological data with a period range of, for example, 3 to 10 days, so that only cyclones remain as fluctuations in the data fields.

=== Loudspeaker enclosures ===
==== Compound or band-pass ====
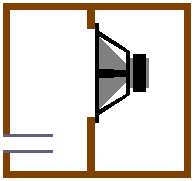
Compound or 4th order band-pass enclosure

A 4th order electrical bandpass filter can be simulated by a vented box in which the contribution from the rear face of the driver cone is trapped in a sealed box, and the radiation from the front surface of the cone is into a ported chamber. This modifies the resonance of the driver. In its simplest form a compound enclosure has two chambers. The dividing wall between the chambers holds the driver; typically only one chamber is ported.

If the enclosure on each side of the woofer has a port in it then the enclosure yields a 6th order band-pass response. These are considerably harder to design and tend to be very sensitive to driver characteristics. As in other reflex enclosures, the ports may generally be replaced by passive radiators if desired.

An eighth order bandpass box is another variation which also has a narrow frequency range. They are often used in sound pressure level competitions, in which case a bass tone of a specific frequency would be used versus anything musical. They are complicated to build and must be done quite precisely in order to perform nearly as intended.

=== Economics ===
Bandpass filters can also be used outside of engineering-related disciplines. A leading example is the use of bandpass filters to extract the business cycle component in economic time series. This reveals more clearly the expansions and contractions in economic activity that dominate the lives of the public and the performance of diverse firms, and therefore is of interest to a wide audience of economists and policy-makers, among others.

Economic data usually has quite different statistical properties than data in say, electrical engineering. It is very common for a researcher to directly carry over traditional methods such as the "ideal" filter, which has a perfectly sharp gain function in the frequency domain. However, in doing so, substantial problems can arise that can cause distortions and make the filter output extremely misleading. As a poignant and simple case, the use of an "ideal" filter on white noise (which could represent for example stock price changes) creates a false cycle. The use of the nomenclature "ideal" implicitly involves a greatly fallacious assumption except on scarce occasions. Nevertheless, the use of the "ideal" filter remains common despite its limitations.

Fortunately, band-pass filters are available that steer clear of such errors, adapt to the data series at hand, and yield more accurate assessments of the business cycle fluctuations in major economic series like Real GDP, Investment, and Consumption - as well as their sub-components. An early work, published in the Review of Economics and Statistics in 2003, more effectively handles the kind of data (stochastic rather than deterministic) arising in macroeconomics. In this paper entitled "General Model-Based Filters for Extracting Trends and Cycles in Economic Time Series", Andrew Harvey and Thomas Trimbur develop a class of adaptive band pass filters. These have been successfully applied in various situations involving business cycle movements in myriad nations in the international economy.

=== 4G and 5G wireless communications ===
Band pass filters can be implemented in 4G and 5G wireless communication systems. Hussaini et al.(2015) stated that, in the application of wireless communication, radio frequency noise is a major concern. In the current development of 5G technology, planer band pass filters are used to suppress RF noises and removing unwanted signals.

Combine, hairpin, parallel-coupled line, step impedance and stub impedance are the designs of experimenting the band pass filter to achieve low insertion loss with a compact size. The necessity of adopting asymmetric frequency response is in behalf of reducing the number of resonators, insertion loss, size and cost of circuit production.

4-pole cross-coupled band pass filter is designed by Hussaini et al.(2015). This band pass filter is designed to cover the 2.5-2.6 GHz and 3.4-3.7 GHz spectrum for the 4G and 5G wireless communication applications respectively. It is developed and extended from 3-pole single-band band pass filter, where an additional resonator is applied to a 3-pole single-band band pass filter. The advanced band pass filter has a compact size with a simple structure, which is convenient for implementation. Moreover, the stop band rejection and selectivity present a good performance in RF noise suppression. Insertion loss is very low when covering the 4G and 5G spectrum, while providing good return loss and group delay.

=== Energy scavengers ===
Energy scavengers are devices that search for energy from the environment efficiently. Band pass filters can be implemented to energy scavengers by converting energy generated from vibration into electric energy. The band pass filter designed by Shahruz (2005), is an ensemble of cantilever beams, which is called the beam-mass system. Ensemble of beam-mass systems can be transformed into a band pass filter when appropriate dimensions of beams and masses are chosen. Although the process of designing a mechanical band pass filter is advanced, further study and work are still required to design more flexible band pass filters to suit large frequency intervals. This mechanical band pass filter could be used on vibration sources with distinct peak-power frequencies.

=== Other fields ===
In neuroscience, visual cortical simple cells were first shown by David Hubel and Torsten Wiesel to have response properties that resemble Gabor filters, which are band-pass.

In astronomy, band-pass filters are used to allow only a single portion of the light spectrum into an instrument. Band-pass filters can help with finding where stars lie on the main sequence, identifying redshifts, and many other applications.

== See also ==
- Atomic line filter
- Audio crossover
- Difference of Gaussians
- Sallen–Key topology
