= Phase shift module =

Microwave network module

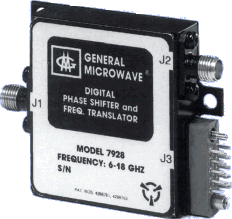
A microwave (6 to 18 GHz) Phase Shifter and Frequency Translator

A phase shift module is a microwave network module which provides a controllable phase shift of the RF signal. Phase shifters are used in phased arrays.

== Classification ==
=== Active versus passive ===
Active phase shifters provide gain, while passive phase shifters are lossy.

- Active:
  - Applications: active electronically scanned array (AESA), passive electronically scanned array (PESA)
  - Gain: The phase shifter amplifies while phase shifting
  - Noise figure (NF)
  - Reciprocity: not reciprocal
- Passive:
  - Applications: active electronically scanned array (AESA), passive electronically scanned array (PESA)
  - Loss: the phase shifter attenuates while phase shifting
  - NF: NF = loss
  - Reciprocity: reciprocal

=== Analog versus digital ===
- Analog phase shifters provide a continuously variable phase shift or time delay.
- Digital phase shifters provide a discrete set of phase shifts or time delays. Discretization leads to quantization errors. Digital phase shifters require parallel bus control.
- Differential, single-ended or waveguide:
  - Differential transmission line: A differential transmission line is a balanced two-conductor transmission line in which the phase difference between currents is 180 degrees. The differential mode is less susceptible to common mode noise and cross talk.
  - Antenna selection: dipole, tapered slot antenna (TSA)
  - Examples: coplanar strip, slotline
- Single-ended transmission line: A single-ended transmission line is a two-conductor transmission line in which one conductor is referenced to a common ground, the second conductor. The single-ended mode is more susceptible to common-mode noise and cross talk.
  - Antenna selection: double folded slot (DFS), microstrip, monopole
  - Examples: CPW, microstrip, stripline
- Waveguide
  - Antenna selection: waveguide, horn

=== One-conductor or dielectric transmission line versus two-conductor transmission line ===
- One-conductor or dielectric transmission line (optical fibre, finline, waveguide):
  - Modal
  - No TEM or quasi-TEM mode, not TTD or quasi-TTD
  - Higher-order TE, TM, HE or HM modes are distorted
- Two-conductor transmission line (CPW, microstrip, slotline, stripline):
  - Differential or single-ended
  - TEM or quasi-TEM mode is TTD or quasi-TTD
- Phase shifters versus TTD phase shifter
  - A phase shifter provides an invariable phase shift with frequency, and is used for fixed-beam frequency-invariant pattern synthesis.
  - A TTD phase shifter provides an invariable time delay with frequency, and is used for squint-free and ultra wideband (UWB) beam steering.

=== Reciprocal versus non-reciprocal ===
- Reciprocal: T/R
- Non-reciprocal: T or R

=== Technology ===
- Non semi-conducting (ferrite, ferro-electric, RF MEMS, liquid crystal):
  - Passive
- Semi-conducting (RF CMOS, GaAs. SiGe, InP, GaN or Sb):
  - Active: BJT or FET transistor based MMICs, RFICs or optical ICs
  - Passive: PIN diode based hybrids

=== Design ===
- Loaded-line:
  - Distortion:
    - Distorted if lumped
    - Undistorted and TTD if distributed
- Reflect-type:
  - Applications: reflect arrays (S_{11} phase shifters)
  - Distortion:
    - Distorted if S_{21} phase shifter, because of 3 dB coupler
    - Undistorted and TTD if S_{11} phase shifter
- Switched-network
  - Network:
    - High-pass or low-pass
    - $\pi$ or T
  - Distortion:
    - Undistorted if the left-handed high-pass sections cancel out the distortion of the right-handed low-pass sections
- Switched-line
  - Applications: UWB beam steering
  - Distortion: undistorted and TTD
- Vector summing

== Figures of merit ==
- Number of effective bits, if digital [bit]
- Biasing: current-driven, high-voltage electrostatic [mA, V]
- DC power consumption [mW]
- Distortion: group velocity dispersion (GVD) [ps^{2}/nm]
- Gain [dB] if active, loss [dB] if passive
- Linearity: IP3, P1dB [dBm]
- Phase shift / noise figure [°/dB] (phase shifter) or time delay / noise figure [ps/dB] (TTD phase shifter)
- Power handling [mW, dBm]
- Reliability [cycles, MTBF]
- Size [mm^{2}]
- Switching time [ns]
