= Planar transmission line =

Transmission lines with flat ribbon-like conducting or dielectric lines

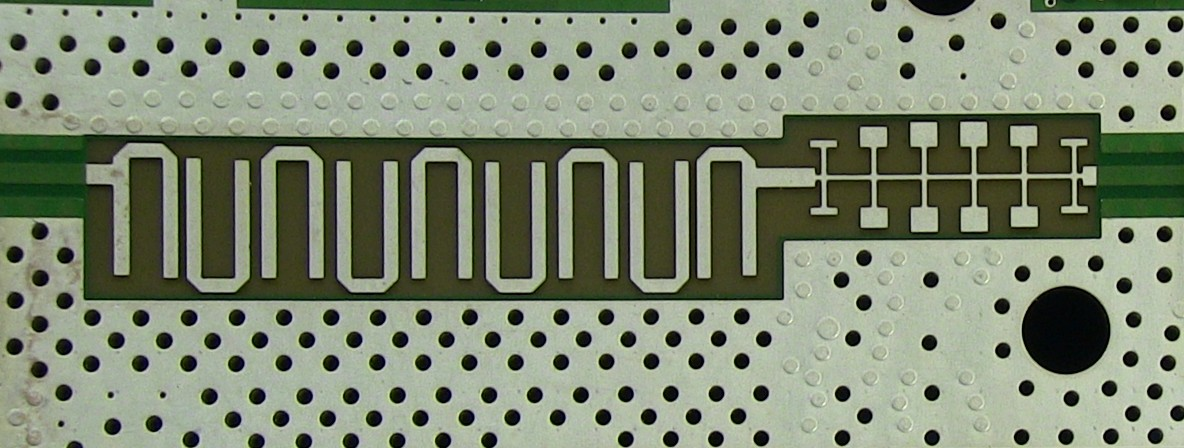
Printed circuit planar transmission lines used to create filters in a 20 GHz spectrum analyser. The structure on the left is called a hairpin filter and is an example of a band-pass filter. The structure on the right is a stub filter and is a low-pass filter. The perforated regions above and below are not transmission lines, but electromagnetic shielding for the circuit.

Planar transmission lines are transmission lines with conductors, or in some cases dielectric (insulating) strips, that are flat, ribbon-shaped lines. They are used to interconnect components on printed circuits and integrated circuits working at microwave frequencies because the planar type fits in well with the manufacturing methods for these components. Transmission lines are more than simply interconnections. With simple interconnections, the propagation of the electromagnetic wave along the wire is fast enough to be considered instantaneous, and the voltages at each end of the wire can be considered identical. If the wire is longer than a large fraction of a wavelength (one tenth is often used as a rule of thumb), these assumptions are no longer true and transmission line theory must be used instead. With transmission lines, the geometry of the line is precisely controlled (in most cases, the cross-section is kept constant along the length) so that its electrical behaviour is highly predictable. At lower frequencies, these considerations are only necessary for the cables connecting different pieces of equipment, but at microwave frequencies the distance at which transmission line theory becomes necessary is measured in millimetres. Hence, transmission lines are needed within circuits.

The earliest type of planar transmission line was conceived during World War II by Robert M. Barrett. It is known as stripline, and is one of the four main types in modern use, along with microstrip, suspended stripline, and coplanar waveguide. All four of these types consist of a pair of conductors (although in three of them, one of these conductors is the ground plane). Consequently, they have a dominant mode of transmission (the mode is the field pattern of the electromagnetic wave) that is identical, or near-identical, to the mode found in a pair of wires. Other planar types of transmission line, such as slotline, finline, and imageline, transmit along a strip of dielectric, and substrate-integrated waveguide forms a dielectric waveguide within the substrate with rows of posts. These types cannot support the same mode as a pair of wires, and consequently they have different transmission properties. Many of these types have a narrower bandwidth and in general produce more signal distortion than pairs of conductors. Their advantages depend on the exact types being compared, but can include low loss and a better range of characteristic impedance.

Planar transmission lines can be used for constructing components as well as interconnecting them. At microwave frequencies it is often the case that individual components in a circuit are themselves larger than a significant fraction of a wavelength. This means they can no longer be treated as lumped components, that is, treated as if they existed at a single point. Lumped passive components are often impractical at microwave frequencies, either for this reason, or because the values required are impractically small to manufacture. A pattern of transmission lines can be used for the same function as these components. Whole circuits, called distributed-element circuits, can be built this way. The method is often used for filters. This method is particularly appealing for use with printed and integrated circuits because these structures can be manufactured with the same processes as the rest of the assembly simply by applying patterns to the existing substrate. This gives the planar technologies a big economic advantage over other types, such as coaxial line.

Some authors make a distinction between transmission line, a line that uses a pair of conductors, and waveguide, a line that either does not use conductors at all, or just uses one conductor to constrain the wave in the dielectric. Others use the terms synonymously. This article includes both kinds, so long as they are in a planar form. Names used are the common ones and do not necessarily indicate the number of conductors. The term waveguide when used unadorned, means the hollow, or dielectric filled, metal kind of waveguide, which is not a planar form.

== General properties ==
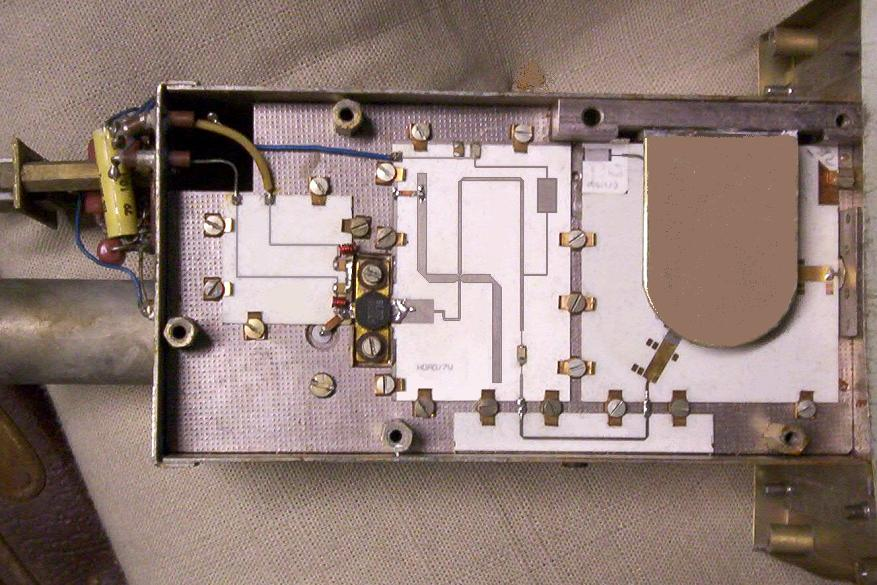
An RF power amplifier incorporating planar circuit structures. The amplifier on the left feeds its output into a set of planar transmission line filters in the centre. The third circuit block on the right is a circulator to protect the amplifier from accidental reflections of the power back from the antenna

Planar transmission lines are those transmission lines in which the conductors are essentially flat. The conductors consist of flat strips, and there are usually one or more ground planes parallel to the flat surface of the conductors. The conductors are separated from the ground planes, sometimes with air between them but more often with a solid dielectric material. Transmission lines can also be constructed in non-planar formats such as wires or coaxial line. As well as interconnections, there are a wide range of circuits that can be implemented in transmission lines. These include filters, power dividers, directional couplers, impedance matching networks, and choke circuits to deliver biasing to active components. The principal advantage of the planar types is that they can be manufactured using the same processes used to make printed circuits and integrated circuits, particularly through the photolithography process. The planar technologies are thus particularly well suited to mass production of such components.

Making circuit elements out of transmission lines is most useful at microwave frequencies. At lower frequencies the longer wavelength makes these components too bulky. At the highest microwave frequencies planar transmission line types are generally too lossy and waveguide is used instead. Waveguide, however, is bulkier and more expensive to manufacture. At still higher frequencies dielectric waveguide (such as optical fibre) becomes the technology of choice, but there are planar types of dielectric waveguide available. The most widely used planar transmission lines (of any kind) are stripline, microstrip, suspended stripline, and coplanar waveguide.

== Modes ==
Field patterns for selected modes: A, quasi-TEM in microstrip, B, quasi-TEM in CPW (even mode), C, slotline mode in CPW (odd mode)

An important parameter for transmission lines is the mode of transmission employed. The mode describes the electromagnetic field patterns caused by the geometry of the transmission structure. It is possible for more than one mode to exist simultaneously on the same line. Usually, steps are taken to suppress all modes except the desired one. But some devices, such as the dual-mode filter, rely on the transmission of more than one mode.

=== TEM mode ===
The mode found on ordinary conductive wires and cables is the transverse electromagnetic mode (TEM mode). This is also the dominant mode on some planar transmission lines. In the TEM mode, the field strength vectors for the electric and magnetic field are both transverse to the direction of travel of the wave and orthogonal to each other. An important property of the TEM mode is that it can be used at low frequencies, all the way down to zero (i.e. DC).

Another feature of the TEM mode is that on an ideal transmission line (one that meets the Heaviside condition) there is no change of line transmission parameters (characteristic impedance and signal group velocity) with the frequency of transmission. Because of this, ideal TEM transmission lines do not suffer from dispersion, a form of distortion in which different frequency components travel at different velocities. Dispersion "smears out" the wave shape (which may represent the transmitted information) in the direction of the line length. All other modes suffer from dispersion, which puts a limit on the bandwidth achievable.

=== Quasi-TEM modes ===
Some planar types, notably microstrip, do not have a homogeneous dielectric; it is different above and below the line. Such geometries cannot support a true TEM mode; there is some component of the electromagnetic field parallel to the direction of the line, although the transmission can be nearly TEM. Such a mode is referred to as quasi-TEM. In a TEM line, discontinuities such as gaps and posts (used to construct filters and other devices) have an impedance that is purely reactive: they can store energy, but do not dissipate it. In most quasi-TEM lines, these structures additionally have a resistive component to the impedance. This resistance is a result of radiation from the structure and causes the circuit to be lossy. The same problem occurs at bends and corners of the line. These problems can be mitigated by using a high permittivity material as the substrate, which causes a higher proportion of the wave to be contained in the dielectric, making for a more homogeneous transmission medium and a mode closer to TEM.

=== Transverse modes ===
In hollow metal waveguides and optical waveguides there are an unlimited number of other transverse modes that can occur. However, the TEM mode cannot be supported since it requires two or more separate conductors to propagate. The transverse modes are classified as either transverse electric (TE, or H modes) or transverse magnetic (TM, or E modes) according to whether, respectively, all of the electric field, or all of the magnetic field is transverse. There is always a longitudinal component of one field or the other. The exact mode is identified by a pair of indices counting the number of wavelengths or half-wavelengths along specified transverse dimensions. These indices are usually written without a separator: for instance, TE_{10}. The exact definition depends on whether the waveguide is rectangular, circular, or elliptical. For waveguide resonators a third index is introduced to the mode for half-wavelengths in the longitudinal direction.

A feature of TE and TM modes is that there is a definite cutoff frequency below which transmission will not take place. The cutoff frequency depends on mode and the mode with the lowest cutoff frequency is called the dominant mode. Multi-mode propagation is generally undesirable. Because of this, circuits are often designed to operate in the dominant mode at frequencies below the cutoff of the next highest mode. Only one mode, the dominant mode, can exist in this band.

Some planar types that are designed to operate as TEM devices can also support TE and TM modes unless steps are taken to suppress them. The ground planes or shielding enclosures can behave as hollow waveguides and propagate these modes. Suppression can take the form of shorting screws between the ground planes or designing the enclosure to be too small to support frequencies as low as the operational frequencies of the circuit. Similarly, coaxial cable can support circular TE and TM modes that do not require the centre conductor to propagate, and these modes can be suppressed by reducing the diameter of the cable.

=== Longitudinal-section modes ===
Some transmission line structures are unable to support a pure TE or TM mode, but can support modes that are a linear superposition of TE and TM modes. In other words, they have a longitudinal component of both electric and magnetic field. Such modes are called hybrid electromagnetic (HEM) modes. A subset of the HEM modes is the longitudinal-section modes. These come in two varieties; longitudinal-section electric (LSE) modes and longitudinal-section magnetic (LSM) modes. LSE modes have an electric field that is zero in one transverse direction, and LSM modes have a magnetic field that is zero in one transverse direction. LSE and LSM modes can occur in planar transmission line types with non-homogeneous transmission media. Structures that are unable to support a pure TE or TM mode, if they are able to support transmissions at all, must necessarily do so with a hybrid mode.

== Other important parameters ==
The characteristic impedance of a line is the impedance encountered by a wave travelling along the line; it depends only on the line geometry and materials and is not changed by the line termination. It is necessary to match the characteristic impedance of the planar line to the impedance of the systems to which it is connected. Many filter designs require lines with a number of different characteristic impedances, so it is an advantage for a technology to have a good range of achievable impedances. Narrow lines have a higher impedance than broad lines. The highest impedance achievable is limited by the resolution of the manufacturing process which imposes a limit on how narrow the lines can be made. The lower limit is determined by the width of line at which unwanted transverse resonance modes might arise.

Q factor (or just Q) is the ratio of energy stored to energy dissipated per cycle. It is the main parameter characterising the quality of resonators. In transmission line circuits, resonators are frequently constructed of transmission line sections to build filters and other devices. Their Q factor limits the steepness of the filter skirts and its selectivity. The main factors determining Q of a planar type are the permittivity of the dielectric (high permittivity increases Q) and the dielectric losses, which decrease Q. Other factors that lower Q are the resistance of the conductor and radiation losses.

Summary of major characteristics of planar types
Line type	Dominant mode	Typical max. frequency	Characteristic impedance	Unloaded Q factor
Stripline	TEM	60 GHz	30–250 Ω at ε_{r} = 4.3	400
Suspended stripline	TEM, quasi-TEM	220 GHz	40–150 Ω at ε_{r} = 10	600 at 30 GHz, ε_{r} = 10
Microstrip	Quasi-TEM	110 GHz	10–110 Ω at ε_{r} = 10	250 at 30 GHz, ε_{r} = 10
Coplanar waveguide	Quasi-TEM	110 GHz	40–110 Ω at ε_{r} = 10	200 at 30 GHz, ε_{r} = 10
Slotline	Quasi-TE	110 GHz	35–250 Ω at ε_{r} = 10	200 at 30 GHz, ε_{r} = 10
Finline	LSE, LSM	220 GHz	10–400 Ω at ε_{r} = 10	550 at 30 GHz, ε_{r} = 10
Imageline	TE, TM	>100 GHz	≈26 Ω at ε_{r} = 10	2500 at 30 GHz, ε_{r} = 10

• ε_{r} is the relative permittivity of the substrate.

== Substrates ==
There are a wide range of substrates that are used with planar technologies. For printed circuits, glass-reinforced epoxy (FR-4 grade) is commonly used. High permittivity ceramic-PTFE laminates (e.g. Rogers Corporation 6010 board) are expressly intended for microwave applications. At the higher microwave frequencies, a ceramic material such as aluminium oxide (alumina) might be used for hybrid microwave integrated circuits (MICs). At the very highest microwave frequencies, in the millimetre band, a crystalline substrate might be used such as sapphire or quartz. Monolithic microwave integrated circuits (MMICs) will have substrates composed of the semiconductor material of which the chip is built such as silicon or gallium arsenide, or an oxide deposited on the chip such as silicon dioxide.

The electrical properties of the substrate of most interest are the relative permittivity (ε_{r}) and the loss tangent (δ). The relative permittivity determines the characteristic impedance of a given line width and the group velocity of signals travelling on it. High permittivity results in smaller printed components, aiding miniaturisation. In quasi-TEM types, permittivity determines how much of the field will be contained within the substrate and how much is in the air above it. The loss tangent is a measure of the dielectric losses. It is desirable to have this as small as possible, especially in circuits which require high Q.

Mechanical properties of interest include the thickness and mechanical strength required of the substrate. In some types, such as suspended stripline and finline, it is advantageous to make the substrate as thin as possible. Delicate semiconductor components mounted on a flexing substrate can become damaged. A hard, rigid material such as quartz might be chosen as the substrate to avoid this problem, rather than an easier-to-machine board. In other types, such as homogeneous stripline, it can be much thicker. For printed antennae, that are conformal to the device shape, flexible, hence very thin, substrates are required. The thickness required for electrical performance depends on the permittivity of the material. Surface finish is an issue; some roughness may be required to ensure adhesion of the metallisation, but too much causes conductor losses (as the consequent roughness of the metallization becomes significant compared with the skin depth). Thermal properties can be important. Thermal expansion changes the electrical properties of lines and can break plated through holes.

Properties of common substrate materials
Substrate	ε_{r}	δ
Silicon	11.9	0.015
Gallium arsenide	12.9	0.002
FR-4	4.3	0.022
6010	10.2	0.002
Alumina	9.8	0.0001
Sapphire	9.4	0.0001
Quartz	3.8	0.0001

== Types ==
=== Stripline ===
Stripline

Stripline is a strip conductor embedded in a dielectric between two ground planes. It is usually constructed as two sheets of dielectric clamped together with the stripline pattern on one side of one sheet. The main advantage of stripline over its principal rival, microstrip, is that transmission is purely in the TEM mode and is free of dispersion, at least over the distances encountered in stripline applications. Stripline is capable of supporting TE and TM modes but these are not generally used. The main disadvantage is that it is not as easy as microstrip to incorporate discrete components. For any that are incorporated, cutouts have to be provided in the dielectric and they are not accessible once assembled.

==== Suspended stripline ====
Suspended stripline

Suspended stripline is a type of air stripline in which the substrate is suspended between the ground planes with an air gap above and below. The idea is to minimise dielectric losses by having the wave travel through air. The purpose of the dielectric is only for mechanical support of the conductor strip. Since the wave is travelling through the mixed media of air and dielectric, the transmission mode is not truly TEM, but a thin dielectric renders this effect negligible. Suspended stripline is used in the mid microwave frequencies where it is superior to microstrip with respect to losses, but not as bulky or expensive as waveguide.

==== Other stripline variants ====
Stripline variants: A, standard, B, suspended, C, bilateral suspended, D, two conductor

The idea of two conductor stripline is to compensate for air gaps between the two substrates. Small air gaps are inevitable because of manufacturing tolerances and the thickness of the conductor. These gaps can promote radiation away from the line between the ground planes. Printing identical conductors on both boards ensures the fields are equal in both substrates and the electric field in the gaps due to the two lines cancels out. Usually, one line is made slightly undersize to prevent small misalignments effectively widening the line, and consequently reducing the characteristic impedance.

The bilateral suspended stripline has more of the field in the air and almost none in the substrate leading to higher Q, compared to standard suspended stripline. The disadvantage of doing this is that the two lines have to be bonded together at intervals less than a quarter wavelength apart. The bilateral structure can also be used to couple two independent lines across their broad side. This gives much stronger coupling than side-by-side coupling and allows coupled-line filter and directional coupler circuits to be realised that are not possible in standard stripline.

=== Microstrip ===
Microstrip

Microstrip consists of a strip conductor on the top surface of a dielectric layer and a ground plane on the bottom surface of the dielectric. The electromagnetic wave travels partly in the dielectric and partly in the air above the conductor resulting in quasi-TEM transmission. Despite the drawbacks of the quasi-TEM mode, microstrip is often favoured for its easy compatibility with printed circuits. In any case, these effects are not so severe in a miniaturised circuit.

Another drawback of microstrip is that it is more limited than other types in the range of characteristic impedances that it can achieve. Some circuit designs require characteristic impedances of 150 Ω or more. Microstrip is not usually capable of going that high so either those circuits are not available to the designer or a transition to another type has to be provided for the component requiring the high impedance.

Microstrip inverted-F antenna

The tendency of microstrip to radiate is generally a disadvantage of the type, but when it comes to creating antennae it is a positive advantage. It is very easy to make a patch antenna in microstrip, and a variant of the patch, the planar inverted-F antenna, is the most widely used antenna in mobile devices.

==== Microstrip variants ====
Microstrip variants: A, standard, B, suspended, C, inverted, D, in box, E, trapped inverted

Suspended microstrip has the same aim as suspended stripline; to put the field into air rather than the dielectric to reduce losses and dispersion. The reduced permittivity results in larger printed components, which limits miniaturisation, but makes the components easier to manufacture. Suspending the substrate increases the maximum frequency at which the type can be used.

Inverted microstrip has similar properties to suspended microstrip with the additional benefit that most of the field is contained in the air between the conductor and the groundplane. There is very little stray field above the substrate available to link to other components. Trapped inverted microstrip shields the line on three sides preventing some higher order modes that are possible with the more open structures. Placing the line in a shielded box completely avoids any stray coupling but the substrate must now be cut to fit the box. Fabricating a complete device on one large substrate is not possible using this structure.

=== Coplanar waveguide and coplanar strips ===
Coplanar waveguide

Coplanar waveguide (CPW) has the return conductors on top of the substrate in the same plane as the main line, unlike stripline and microstrip where the return conductors are ground planes above or below the substrate. The return conductors are placed either side of the main line and made wide enough that they can be considered to extend to infinity. Like microstrip, CPW has quasi-TEM propagation.

CPW is simpler to manufacture; there is only one plane of metallization and components can be surface mounted whether they are connected in series (spanning a break in the line) or shunt (between the line and the ground). Shunt components in stripline and microstrip require a connection through to the bottom of the substrate. CPW is also easier to miniaturise; its characteristic impedance depends on the ratio of the line width to the distance between return conductors rather than the absolute value of line width.

Despite its advantages, CPW has not proved popular. A disadvantage is that return conductors take up a large amount of board area that cannot be used for mounting components, though it is possible in some designs to achieve a greater density of components than microstrip. More seriously, there is a second mode in CPW that has zero frequency cutoff called the slotline mode. Since this mode cannot be avoided by operating below it, and multiple modes are undesirable, it needs to be suppressed. It is an odd mode, meaning that the electric potentials on the two return conductors are equal and opposite. Thus, it can be suppressed by bonding the two return conductors together. This can be achieved with a bottom ground plane (conductor-backed coplanar waveguide, CBCPW) and periodic plated through holes, or periodic air bridges on the top of the board. Both these solutions detract from the basic simplicity of CPW.

==== Coplanar variants ====
CPW variants: A, standard, B, CBCPW, C, coplanar strips, D, embedded coplanar strips

Coplanar strips (also coplanar stripline or differential line) are usually used only for RF applications below the microwave band. The lack of a ground plane leads to a poorly defined field pattern and the losses from stray fields are too great at microwave frequencies. On the other hand, the lack of ground planes means that the type is amenable to embedding in multi-layer structures.

=== Slotline ===
Slotline

A slotline is a slot cut in the metallisation on top of the substrate. It is the dual of microstrip, a dielectric line surrounded by conductor instead of a conducting line surrounded by dielectric. The dominant propagation mode is hybrid, quasi-TE with a small longitudinal component of electric field.

Slotline is essentially a balanced line, unlike stripline and microstrip, which are unbalanced lines. This type makes it particularly easy to connect components to the line in shunt; surface mount components can be mounted bridging across the line. Another advantage of slotline is that high impedance lines are easier to achieve. Characteristic impedance increases with line width (compare microstrip where it decreases with width) so there is no issue with printing resolution for high impedance lines.

A disadvantage of slotline is that both characteristic impedance and group velocity vary strongly with frequency, resulting in slotline being more dispersive than microstrip. Slotline also has a relatively low Q.

==== Slotline variants ====
Slotline variants: A, standard, B, antipodal, C, bilateral

Antipodal slotline is used where very low characteristic impedances are required. With dielectric lines, low impedance means narrow lines (the opposite of the case with conducting lines) and there is a limit to the thinness of line that can be achieved because of the printing resolution. With the antipodal structure, the conductors can even overlap without any danger of short-circuiting. Bilateral slotline has advantages similar to those of bilateral air stripline.

=== Substrate-integrated waveguide ===
Substrate-integrated waveguide

Substrate-integrated waveguide (SIW), also called laminated waveguide or post-wall waveguide, is a waveguide formed in the substrate dielectric by constraining the wave between two rows of posts or plated through holes and ground planes above and below the substrate. The dominant mode is a quasi-TE mode. SIW is intended as a cheaper alternative to hollow metal waveguide while retaining many of its benefits. The greatest benefit is that, as an effectively enclosed waveguide, it has considerably less radiation loss than microstrip. There is no unwanted coupling of stray fields to other circuit components. SIW also has high Q and high power handling, and, as a planar technology, is easier to integrate with other components.

SIW can be implemented on printed circuit boards or as low-temperature co-fired ceramic (LTCC). The latter is particularly suited to implementing SIW. Active circuits are not directly implemented in SIW: the usual technique is to implement the active part in stripline through a stripline-to-SIW transition. Antennae can be created directly in SIW by cutting slots in the ground planes. A horn antenna can be made by flaring the rows of posts at the end of a waveguide.

==== SIW variants ====
There is an SIW version of ridge waveguide. Ridge waveguide is a rectangular hollow metal waveguide with an internal longitudinal wall part-way across the E-plane. The principal advantage of ridge waveguide is that it has a very wide bandwidth. Ridge SIW is not very easy to implement in printed circuit boards because the equivalent of the ridge is a row of posts that only go part-way through the board. But the structure can be created more easily in LTCC.

=== Finline ===
Finline

Finline consists of a sheet of metallised dielectric inserted into the E-plane of a rectangular metal waveguide. This mixed format is sometimes called quasi-planar. The design is not intended to generate waveguide modes in the rectangular waveguide as such: instead, a line is cut in the metallisation exposing the dielectric and it is this that acts as a transmission line. Finline is thus a type of dielectric waveguide and can be viewed as a shielded slotline.

Finline is similar to ridge waveguide in that the metallisation of the substrate represents the ridge (the "fin") and the finline represents the gap. Filters can be constructed in ridge waveguide by varying the height of the ridge in a pattern. A common way of manufacturing these is to take a thin sheet of metal with pieces cut out (typically, a series of rectangular holes) and insert this in the waveguide in much the same way as finline. A finline filter is able to implement patterns of arbitrary complexity whereas the metal insert filter is limited by the need for mechanical support and integrity.

Finline has been used at frequencies up to 220 GHz and experimentally tested to at least 700 GHz. At these frequencies it has a considerable advantage over microstrip for its low loss and it can be manufactured with similar low-cost printed circuit techniques. It is also free of radiation since it is completely enclosed in the rectangular waveguide. A metal insert device has an even lower loss because it is air dielectric, but has very limited circuit complexity. A full waveguide solution for a complex design retains the low loss of air dielectric, but it would be much bulkier than finline and significantly more expensive to manufacture. A further advantage of finline is that it can achieve a particularly wide range of characteristic impedances. Biasing of transistors and diodes cannot be achieved in finline by feeding bias current down the main transmission line, as is done in stripline and microstrip, since the finline is not a conductor. Separate arrangements have to be made for biasing in finline.

==== Finline variants ====
Finline variants: A, standard (unilateral), B, bilateral, C, antipodal, D, strongly coupled antipodal E, insulated

Unilateral finline is the simplest design and easiest to manufacture but bilateral finline has lower loss, as with bilateral suspended stripline, and for similar reasons. The high Q of bilateral finline often makes it the choice for filter applications. Antipodal finline is used where very low characteristic impedance is required. The stronger the coupling between the two planes, the lower the impedance. Insulated finline is used in circuits that contain active components needing bias lines. The Q of insulated finline is lower than other finline types so it is otherwise not usually used.

=== Imageline ===
Imageline

Imageline, also image line or image guide, is a planar form of dielectric slab waveguide. It consists of a strip of dielectric, often alumina, on a metal sheet. In this type, there is no dielectric substrate extending in all horizontal directions, only the dielectric line. It is so called because the ground plane acts as a mirror resulting in a line that is equivalent to a dielectric slab without the ground plane of twice the height. It shows promise for use at the higher microwave frequencies, around 100 GHz, but it is still largely experimental. For instance Q factors in the thousands are theoretically possible but radiation from bends and losses in the dielectric-metal adhesive significantly reduce this figure. A disadvantage of imageline is that the characteristic impedance is fixed at a single value of about 26 Ω.

Imageline supports TE and TM modes. The dominant TE and TM modes have a cutoff frequency of zero, unlike hollow metal waveguides whose TE and TM modes all have a finite frequency below which propagation cannot occur. As the frequency approaches zero, the longitudinal component of field diminishes and the mode asymptotically approaches the TEM mode. Imageline thus shares the property of being able to propagate waves at arbitrarily low frequencies with the TEM type lines, although it cannot actually support a TEM wave. Despite this, imageline is not a suitable technology at lower frequencies. A drawback of imageline is that it must be precisely machined as surface roughness increases radiation losses.

==== Imageline variants and other dielectric lines ====
Imageline variants: A, standard, B, insular, C, trapped; other dielectric lines: D, ribline, E, strip dielectric guide, F, inverted strip dielectric guide

In insular imageline a thin layer of low permittivity insulator is deposited over the metal ground plane and the higher permittivity imageline is set on top of this. The insulating layer has the effect of reducing conductor losses. This type also has lower radiation losses on straight sections, but like the standard imageline, radiation losses are high at bends and corners. Trapped imageline overcomes this drawback, but is more complex to manufacture since it detracts from the simplicity of the planar structure.

Ribline is a dielectric line machined from the substrate as a single piece. It has similar properties to insular imageline. Like imageline, it must be precisely machined. Strip dielectric guide is a low permittivity strip (usually plastic) placed on a high permittivity substrate such as alumina. The field is largely contained in the substrate between the strip and the ground plane. Because of this, this type does not have the precise machining requirements of standard imageline and ribline. Inverted strip dielectric guide has lower conductor losses because the field in the substrate has been moved away from the conductor, but it has higher radiation losses.

=== Multiple layers ===
Multilayer circuits can be constructed in printed circuits or monolithic integrated circuits, but LTCC is the most amenable technology for implementing planar transmission lines as multilayers. In a multilayer circuit at least some of the lines will be buried, completely enclosed by dielectric. The losses will not, therefore, be as low as with a more open technology, but very compact circuits can be achieved with multilayer LTCC.

== Transitions ==
Transitions: A, microstrip to SIW, B, CPW to SIW, C, microstrip to CPW, the dotted line marks the boundary of the microstrip groundplane, D, CPW to slotline

Different parts of a system may be best implemented in different types. Transitions between the various types are therefore required. Transitions between types using unbalanced conductive lines are straightforward: this is mostly a matter of providing continuity of the conductor through the transition and ensuring a good impedance match. The same can be said for transitions to non-planar types such as coaxial. A transition between stripline and microstrip needs to ensure that both ground planes of the stripline are adequately electrically bonded to the microstrip ground plane. One of these groundplanes can be continuous through the transition, but the other ends at the transition. There is a similar issue with the microstrip to CPW transition shown at C in the diagram. There is only one ground plane in each type but it changes from one side of the substrate to the other at the transition. This can be avoided by printing the microstrip and CPW lines on opposite sides of the substrate. In this case, the ground plane is continuous on one side of the substrate but a via is required on the line at the transition.

Transitions between conductive lines and dielectric lines or waveguides are more complex. In these cases, a change of mode is required. Transitions of this sort consist of forming some kind of antenna in one type that acts as a launcher into the new type. Examples of this are coplanar waveguide (CPW) or microstrip converted to slotline or substrate-integrated waveguide (SIW). For wireless devices, transitions to the external antennae are also required.

Transitions to and from finline can be treated in a similar way to slotline. However, it is more natural for finline transitions to go to waveguide; the waveguide is already there. A simple transition into waveguide consists of a smooth exponential taper (Vivaldi antenna) of the finline from a narrow line to the full height of the waveguide. The earliest application of finline was to launch into circular waveguide.

A transition from a balanced to an unbalanced line requires a balun circuit. An example of this is CPW to slotline. Example D in the diagram shows this kind of transition and features a balun consisting of a dielectric radial stub. The component shown thus in this circuit is an air bridge bonding the two CPW ground planes together. All transitions have some insertion loss and add to the complexity of the design. It is sometimes advantageous to design with a single integrated type for the whole device to minimise the number of transitions even when the compromise type is not optimal for each of the component circuits.

== History ==
The development of planar technologies was driven at first by the needs of the US military, but today they can be found in mass-produced household items such as mobile phones and satellite TV receivers. According to Thomas H. Lee, Harold A. Wheeler may have experimented with coplanar lines as early as the 1930s, but the first documented planar transmission line was stripline, invented by Robert M. Barrett of the Air Force Cambridge Research Center, and published by Barrett and Barnes in 1951. Although publication did not occur until the 1950s, stripline had actually been used during World War II. According to Barrett, the first stripline power divider was built by V. H. Rumsey and H. W. Jamieson during this period. As well as issuing contracts, Barrett encouraged research in other organisations, including the Airborne Instruments Laboratory Inc. (AIL). Microstrip followed soon after in 1952 and is due to Grieg and Engelmann. The quality of common dielectric materials was at first not good enough for microwave circuits, and consequently, their use did not become widespread until the 1960s. Stripline and microstrip were commercial rivals. Stripline was the brand name of AIL who made air stripline. Microstrip was made by ITT. Later, dielectric-filled stripline under the brand name triplate was manufactured by Sanders Associates. Stripline became a generic term for dielectric filled stripline and air stripline or suspended stripline is now used to distinguish the original type.

Stripline was initially preferred to its rival because of the dispersion issue. In the 1960s, the need to incorporate miniature solid-state components in MICs swung the balance to microstrip. Miniaturisation also leads to favouring microstrip because its disadvantages are not so severe in a miniaturised circuit. Stripline is still chosen where operation over a wide band is required. The first planar slab dielectric line, imageline, is due to King in 1952. King initially used semicircular imageline, making it equivalent to the already well-studied circular rod dielectric. Slotline, the first printed planar dielectric line type, is due to Cohn in 1968. Coplanar waveguide is due to Wen in 1969. Finline, as a printed technology, is due to Meier in 1972, although Robertson created finline-like structures much earlier (1955–56) with metal inserts. Robertson fabricated circuits for diplexers and couplers and coined the term finline. SIW was first described by Hirokawa and Ando in 1998.

At first, components made in planar types were made as discrete parts connected together, usually with coaxial lines and connectors. It was quickly realised that the size of circuits could be hugely reduced by directly connecting components together with planar lines within the same housing. This led to the concept of hybrid MICs: hybrid because lumped components were included in the designs connected together with planar lines. Since the 1970s, there has been a great proliferation in new variations of the basic planar types to aid miniaturisation and mass production. Further miniaturisation became possible with the introduction of MMICs. In this technology, the planar transmission lines are directly incorporated in the semiconductor slab in which the integrated circuit components have been manufactured. The first MMIC, an X band amplifier, is due to Pengelly and Turner of Plessey in 1976.

== Circuit gallery ==
Planar circuits

A small selection of the many circuits that can be constructed with planar transmission lines are shown in the figure. Such circuits are a class of distributed-element circuits. Microstrip and slotline types of directional couplers are shown at A and B respectively. Generally, a circuit form in conducting lines like stripline or microstrip has a dual form in dielectric line such as slotline or finline with the roles of the conductor and insulator reversed. The line widths of the two types are inversely related; narrow conducting lines result in high impedance, but in dielectric lines, the result is low impedance. Another example of dual circuits is the bandpass filter consisting of coupled lines shown at C in conductor form and at D in dielectric form.

Each section of line acts as a resonator in the coupled lines filters. Another kind of resonator is shown in the SIW bandpass filter at E. Here posts placed in the centre of the waveguide act as resonators. Item F is a slotline hybrid ring featuring a mixture of both CPW and slotline feeds into its ports. The microstrip version of this circuit requires one section of the ring to be three-quarters wavelength long. In the slotline/CPW version all sections are one-quarter wavelength because there is a 180° phase inversion at the slotline junction.

== Bibliography ==
- Barrett, R. M., "Etched sheets serve as microwave components", Electronics, vol. 25, pp. 114–118, June 1952.
- Barrett, R. M.; Barnes, M. H., "Microwave printed circuits", Radio TV News, vol. 46, 16 September 1951.
- Becherrawy, Tamer, Electromagnetism: Maxwell Equations, Wave Propagation and Emission, Wiley, 2013 ISBN 1-118-58777-4.
- Bhartia, Prakash; Pramanick, Protap, "Fin-line characteristics and circuits", ch. 1 in, Button, Kenneth J., Topics in Millimeter Wave Technology: Volume 1, Elsevier, 2012 ISBN 0-323-14087-4.
- Bhat, Bharathi; Koul, Shiban K., Stripline-like Transmission Lines for Microwave Integrated Circuits, New Age International, 1989 ISBN 81-224-0052-3.
- Blank, Jon; Buntschuh, Charles, "Directional couplers", ch. 7 in, Ishii, T. Koryu, Handbook of Microwave Technology: Volume 1: Components and Devices, Academic Press, 2013 ISBN 0-08-052377-3.
- Chang, Kai; Hsieh, Lung-Hwa, Microwave Ring Circuits and Related Structures, Wiley, 2004 ISBN 0-471-44474-X.
- Cohn, S. B., "Slot line – an alternative transmission medium for integrated circuits", G-MTT International Microwave Symposium, pp. 104–109, 1968.
- Connor, F. R., Wave Transmission, Edward Arnold, 1972 ISBN 0-7131-3278-7.
- Das, Annapurna; Das, Sisir K., Microwave Engineering, Tata McGraw-Hill, 2009 ISBN 0-07-066738-1.
- Edwards, Terry; Steer, Michael, Foundations for Microstrip Circuit Design, Wiley, 2016 ISBN 1-118-93619-1.
- Fang, D. G., Antenna Theory and Microstrip Antennas, CRC Press, 2009 ISBN 1-4398-0739-6.
- Flaviis, Franco De, "Guided waves", ch. 5 in, Chen, Wai-Kai (ed.), The Electrical Engineering Handbook, Academic Press, 2004 ISBN 0-08-047748-8.
- Garg, Ramesh, Microstrip Antenna Design Handbook, Artech House, 2001 ISBN 0-89006-513-6.
- Garg, Ramesh; Bahl, Inder; Bozzi, Maurizio, Microstrip Lines and Slotlines, Artech House, 2013 ISBN 1-60807-535-4.
- Grebennikov, Andrei, RF and Microwave Transmitter Design, Wiley, 2011 ISBN 0-470-93465-4.
- Grieg, D. D.; Engelmann, H. F., "Microstrip – A new transmission technique for the kilomegacycle range", Proceedings of the IRE, vol. 40, iss. 12, pp. 1644–1650, December 1952.
- Heinen, Stefan; Klein, Norbert, "RF and microwave communication – systems, circuits and devices", ch. 36 in, Waser, Rainer (ed), Nanoelectronics and Information Technology, Wiley, 2012 ISBN 3-527-40927-0.
- Helszajn, J., Ridge Waveguides and Passive Microwave Components, IET, 2000 ISBN 0-85296-794-2.
- Hirowkawa, J.; Ando, M, "Single-layer feed waveguide consisting of posts for plane TEM wave excitation in parallel plates", IEEE Transactions on Antennas and Propagation, vol. 46, iss. 5, pp. 625–630, May 1998.
- Hunter, I. C., Theory and Design of Microwave Filters, IET, 2001 ISBN 0-85296-777-2.
- Ishii, T. K., "Synthesis of distributed circuits", ch. 45 in, Chen, Wai-Kai (ed.), The Circuits and Filters Handbook, 2nd edition, CRC Press, 2002 ISBN 0-8493-0912-3.
- Jarry, Pierre; Beneat, Jacques, Design and Realizations of Miniaturized Fractal Microwave and RF Filters, Wiley, 2009 ISBN 0-470-48781-X.
- King, D. D., "Dielectric image line", Journal of Applied Physics, vol. 23, no. 6, pp. 699–700, June 1952.
- King, D. D., "Properties of dielectric image lines", IRE Transactions on Microwave Theory and Techniques, vol. 3, iss. 2, pp. 75–81, March 1955.
- Kneppo, I.; Fabian, J.; Bezousek, P.; Hrnicko, P.; Pavel, M., Microwave Integrated Circuits, Springer, 2012 ISBN 94-011-1224-X.
- Knox, R. M., Toulios, P. P., Onoda, G. Y., Investigation of the Use of Microwave Image Line Integrated Circuits for Use in Radiometers and Other Microwave Devices in X-band and Above, NASA technical report no. CR 112107, August 1972.
- Kouzaev, Geunnadi A.; Deen, M. Jamal; Nikolova, Natalie K., "Transmission lines and passive components", ch. 2 in, Deen, M. Jamal (ed.), Advances in Imaging and Electron Physics: Volume 174: Silicon-Based Millimeter-Wave Technology, Academic Press, 2012 ISBN 0-12-394636-0.
- Lee, Thomas H., Planar Microwave Engineering, Cambridge University Press, 2004 ISBN 0-521-83526-7.
- Maas, Stephen A., Practical Microwave Circuits, Artech House, 2014 ISBN 1-60807-800-0.
- Maaskant, Rob, "Fast analysis of periodic antennas and metamaterial based waveguides", ch. 3 in, Mittra, Raj (ed.), Computational Electromagnetics: Recent Advances and Engineering Applications, Springer, 2013 ISBN 1-4614-4382-2.
- Maichen, Wolfgang, Digital Timing Measurements, Springer, 2006 ISBN 0-387-31419-9.
- Maloratsky, Leo, Passive RF and Microwave Integrated Circuits, Elsevier, 2003 ISBN 0-08-049205-3.
- Mazierska, Janina; Jacob, Mohan, "High-temperature superconducting planar filters for wireless communication", ch. 6 in, Kiang, Jean-Fu (ed.), Novel Technologies for Microwave and Millimeter – Wave Applications, Springer, 2013 ISBN 1-4757-4156-1.
- Meier, Paul J., "Two new integrated-circuit media with special advantages at millimeter wavelengths", 1972 IEEE GMTT International Microwave Symposium, 22–24 May 1972.
- Menzel, Wolfgang, "Integrated fin-line components for communications, radar, and radiometer applications", ch. 6 in, Button, Kenneth J. (ed.), Infrared and Millimeter Waves: Volume 13: Millimeter Components and Techniques, Part IV, Elsevier, 1985 ISBN 0-323-15277-5.
- Molnar, J. A., Analysis of FIN line Feasibility for W-Band Attenuator Applications, Naval Research Lab Report 6843, 11 June 1991, Defense Technical Information Center accession no. ADA237721.
- Oliner, Arthur A., "The evolution of electromagnetic waveguides", ch. 16 in, Sarkar et al., History of Wireless, John Wiley and Sons, 2006 ISBN 0-471-71814-9.
- Osterman, Michael D.; Pecht, Michael, "Introduction", ch. 1 in, Pecht, Michael (ed.), Handbook of Electronic Package Design, CRC Press, 1991 ISBN 0-8247-7921-5.
- Paolo, Franco Di, Networks and Devices Using Planar Transmission Lines, CRC Press, 2000 ISBN 1-4200-3968-7.
- Pengelly, R. S.; Turner, J. A., "Monolithic broadband GaAs FET amplifiers", Electronics Letters, vol. 12, pp. 251–252, May 1976.
- Pfeiffer, Ullrich, "Millimeter-wave packaging", ch. 2 in, Liu, Pfeiffer, Gaucher, Grzyb, Advanced Millimeter-wave Technologies: Antennas, Packaging and Circuits, Wiley, 2009 ISBN 0-470-74295-X.
- Räisänen, Antti V.; Lehto, Arto, Radio Engineering for Wireless Communication and Sensor Applications, Artech House, 2003 ISBN 1-58053-669-7.
- Rao, R. S., Microwave Engineering, PHI Learning, 2012 ISBN 81-203-4514-2.
- Robertson, S. D., "The ultra-bandwidth finline coupler", IRE Transactions on Microwave Theory and Techniques, vol. 3, iss. 6, pp. 45–48, December 1955.
- Rogers, John W. M.; Plett, Calvin, Radio Frequency Integrated Circuit Design, Artech House, 2010 ISBN 1-60783-980-6.
- Rosloniec, Stanislaw, Fundamental Numerical Methods for Electrical Engineering, Springer, 2008 ISBN 3-540-79519-7.
- Russer, P.; Biebl, E., "Fundamentals", ch. 1 in, Luy, Johann-Friedrich; Russer, Peter (eds.), Silicon-Based Millimeter-Wave Devices, Springer, 2013 ISBN 3-642-79031-3.
- Sander, K. F.; Reed, G. A. L., Transmission and Propagation of Electromagnetic Waves, Cambridge University Press, 1986 ISBN 0-521-31192-6.
- Schantz, Hans G., The Art and Science of Ultrawideband Antennas, Artech House, 2015 ISBN 1-60807-956-2.
- Simons, Rainee N., Coplanar Waveguide Circuits, Components, and Systems, Wiley, 2004 ISBN 0-471-46393-0.
- Sisodia, M. L.; Gupta, Vijay Laxmi, Microwaves: Introduction to Circuits, Devices and Antennas, New Age International, 2007 ISBN 81-224-1338-2.
- Srivastava, Ganesh Prasad; Gupta, Vijay Laxmi, Microwave Devices and Circuit Design, PHI Learning, 2006 ISBN 81-203-2195-2.
- Tan, Boon-Kok, Development of Coherent Detector Technologies for Sub-Millimetre Wave Astronomy Observations, Springer, 2015 ISBN 3-319-19363-5.
- Teshirogi, Tasuku, Modern Millimeter-wave Technologies, IOS Press, 2001 ISBN 1-58603-098-1.
- Wallace, Richard; Andreasson, Krister, Introduction to RF and Microwave Passive Components, Artech House, 2015 ISBN 1-63081-009-6.
- Wanhammar, Lars, Analog Filters using MATLAB, Springer, 2009 ISBN 0-387-92767-0.
- Wen, C. P., "Coplanar waveguide: a surface strip transmission line suitable for nonreciprocal gyromagnetic device applications", IEEE Transactions on Microwave Theory and Techniques, vol. 17, iss. 12, pp. 1087–1090, December 1969.
- Wolff, Ingo, Coplanar Microwave Integrated Circuits, Wiley, 2006 ISBN 0-470-04087-4.
- Wu, Ke; Zhu, Lei; Vahldieck, Ruediger, "Microwave passive components", ch. 7 in, Chen, Wai-Kai (ed.), The Electrical Engineering Handbook, Academic Press, 2004 ISBN 0-08-047748-8.
- Wu, Xuan Hui; Kishk, Ahmed, Analysis and Design of Substrate Integrated Waveguide Using Efficient 2D Hybrid Method, Morgan & Claypool, 2010 ISBN 1-59829-903-4.
- Yarman, Binboga Siddik, Design of Ultra Wideband Antenna Matching Networks, Springer, 2008 ISBN 1-4020-8418-8.
- Yeh, C; Shimabukuro, F, The Essence of Dielectric Waveguides, Springer, 2008 ISBN 0-387-49799-4.
- Zhang, Kequian; Li, Dejie, Electromagnetic Theory for Microwaves and Optoelectronics, Springer, 2013 ISBN 3-662-03553-7.
