= Air stripline =

Electrical planar transmission line suspended between ground planes

Air stripline is a form of electrical planar transmission line whereby a conductor in the form of a thin metal strip is suspended between two ground planes. The idea is to make the dielectric essentially air. Mechanical support of the line may be a thin substrate, periodical insulated supports, or the device connectors and other electrical items.

Air stripline is most commonly used at microwave frequencies, especially in the C band. Its advantage over standard stripline and other planar technologies is that its air dielectric avoids dielectric loss. Many useful circuits can be constructed with air stripline and it is also easier to achieve strong coupling between components in this technology than with other planar formats. It was invented by Robert M. Barrett in the 1950s.

== Structure ==
Diagram of the structure of dielectric supported air stripline

Air stripline is a form of stripline using air as the dielectric material between the central conductor and the ground planes. Using air as the dielectric has the advantage that it avoids the transmission losses usually associated with dielectric materials.

There are two basic ways that air stripline is constructed. In dielectric-supported stripline, also called suspended stripline or suspended substrate, the strip conductor is deposited on a thin solid dielectric substrate, sometimes on both sides, and connected to form a single conductor. This substrate is then clamped in place between the walls supporting the two ground planes. In this method, the strip can be manufactured by printed circuit techniques, making it cheap and leading to the further advantage that other components can be printed on the dielectric in the same operation. The purpose of the solid dielectric is mechanical support for the conductor, but it is made as thin as possible to minimise its electrical effect. The flimsy nature of the substrate means that it can easily be distorted. Because of this, the design needs to take account of thermal stability issues..High-end designs may use a crystalline substrate, such as boron nitride or sapphire, as the suspended substrate.

The other method of construction uses a more substantial solid metal bar as the strip, supported on periodically spaced insulators. This method may be more suitable for high power applications. In such applications, the corners of the conductor cross-section may be rounded to prevent high field intensities and arcing occurring at those points. The insulators are electrically undesirable; they detract from the goal of having a purely air dielectric, add discontinuities to the line, and are potentially a point at which tracking can occur. In some components, there are points at which the lines need to be grounded, either directly or through a discrete component. In such circuits, these grounding points can double as mechanical supports, and the need for supporting insulators is avoided.

== Uses ==
Examples of structures possible with air stripline: directional coupler (top left), branch-line coupler (top right), coupled-line bandpass filter (bottom left), and hybrid ring power splitter (bottom right)

Air stripline finds its greatest use at microwave frequencies in the C band (4–8 GHz). At these frequencies and below it has the advantage of compactness over waveguide. Air stripline can be used outside the C band, but at the higher Ku band (12–18 GHz) waveguide tends to dominate because of its lower loss.

At microwave frequencies, passive circuits such as filters, power dividers and directional couplers tend to be constructed as distributed-element circuits. These circuits can be constructed using any transmission line format. The coaxial line format commonly used for interconnecting devices has been used for this kind of device construction but is not the most convenient format for manufacturing. Stripline was developed as a better solution for circuit construction and air stripline too fills this role. Air stripline is particularly useful in the C band for creating beam forming networks from these components.

Air stripline can achieve strong indirect coupling in these components more easily than other planar formats. In standard stripline, coupling is usually achieved by running the lines side by side for a distance. Coupling between the edges of the lines in this way is relatively weak and is limited by the closest distance the lines can be set together. This limit is governed by the maximum resolution of the printing process and, in power applications, by the electric field strength between the lines. For this reason, stripline parallel coupled lines are used in directional couplers with a coupling factor no more than −10 dB. Power splitters, with their coupling factor of −3 dB, use a direct coupling technique. Air stripline makes use of an alternative arrangement, with lines stacked one atop the other. This broadside coupling is much stronger than edge coupling, so the lines do not need to be so close to achieve the same coupling factor. In dielectric supported stripline, this can be achieved by printing the two lines on opposite sides of the dielectric. Broadside coupling can, of course, be achieved in solid dielectric-filled stripline as well with buried line techniques, but that requires additional dielectric layers and additional manufacturing processes. Another technique available to air stripline to increase coupling is the use of thick rectangular strips to increase side coupling. This also makes mechanical support easier because the lines are more rigid.

== History ==
Stripline was invented by Robert M Barrett of the US Air Force Cambridge Research Center in the early 1950s. Air stripline under the registered mark Stripline was first manufactured commercially by Airborne Instruments Laboratory (AIL) in the form of suspended stripline. However, stripline has since become a generic term for that structure with any dielectric. The unadorned term stripline would now likely be assumed to mean stripline with a solid dielectric. Early on, stripline was the planar technology of choice, but has now been superseded by microstrip for most general purpose applications, especially mass-produced items.

== Bibliography ==
- Bhat, Bharathi; Koul, Shiban K, Stripline-like Transmission Lines for Microwave Integrated Circuits, New Age International, 1989 ISBN 8122400523.
- Pradhan, B P; Barrow, E A, "Microwave air strip transmission line for S-band", IETE Journal of Research, vol. 23, iss. 10, pp. 618–619, 1977.
- Han, C C; Hwang, Y, "Satellite antennas", in, Lo, Y T; Lee, SW, Antenna Handbook: Volume III Applications, chapter 21, Springer, 1993 ISBN 0442015941.
- Maichen, Wolfgang, Digital Timing Measurements, Springer, 2006 ISBN 0387314199.
- Matthaei, George L; Young, Leo; Jones, E M T, Microwave Filters, Impedance-Matching Networks, and Coupling Structures, McGraw-Hill 1964 OCLC 282667.
- Oliner, Arthur A, "The evolution of electromagnetic waveguides: from hollow metallic guides to microwave integrated circuits", chapter 16 in, Sarkar, Tapan K; Mailloux, Robert J; Oliner, Arthur A; Salazar-Palma, Magdalena; Sengupta, Dipak L, History of Wireless, Wiley, 2006 ISBN 0471783013.
- Rosloniec, Stanislaw, Fundamental Numerical Methods for Electrical Engineering, Springer, 2008 ISBN 3540795197.
