= Mazierski =

Mazierski or (feminine) Mazierska is a Polish surname. Notable people with this name include:

- Ewa Mazierska (born 1964), Polish cinema scholar
- Janina Mazierska (born 1948), Polish microwave engineer
- Roman Mazierski (1889–1959), Polish Calvinist clergyman
- Stanisław Mazierski (1915–1993), Polish theologian
