= Triplate =

Triplate may refer to:

- stripline
- Petri dish, when separated into 3 mediums
