= Microvia =

Interconnect between layers in HDI substrates and PCBs

Microvias are used as the interconnects between layers in high density interconnect (HDI) substrates and printed circuit boards (PCBs) to accommodate the high input/output (I/O) density of advanced packages.

Microvias are relevant in electronics manufacturing.

Driven by portability and wireless communications, the electronics industry strives to produce affordable, light, and reliable products with increased functionality. At the electronic component level, this translates to components with increased I/Os with smaller footprint areas (e.g. flip-chip packages, chip-scale packages, and direct chip attachments), and on the printed circuit board and package substrate level, to the use of high density interconnects (HDIs) (e.g. finer lines and spaces, and smaller vias).

== Overview ==
IPC standards revised the definition of a microvia in 2013 to a hole with depth to diameter aspect ratio of 1:1 or less, and the hole depth not to exceed 0.25mm. Previously, microvia was any hole less than or equal to 0.15mm in diameter

With the advent of smartphones and other hand-held electronic devices, microvias have evolved from single-level to stacked microvias that cross over multiple HDI layers. Sequential build-up (SBU) technology is used to fabricate HDI boards. The HDI layers are usually built up from a traditionally manufactured double-sided core board or multilayer PCB. The HDI layers are built on both sides of the traditional PCB one by one with microvias. The SBU process consists of several steps: layer lamination, via formation, via metallization, and via filling. There are multiple choices of materials and/or technologies for each step.

Microvias can be filled with different materials and processes:

1. Filled with epoxy resin (b-stage) during a sequential lamination process step
2. Filled with non-conductive or conductive material other than copper as a separate processing step
3. Plated closed with electroplated copper
4. Screen printed closed with a copper paste

Buried microvias are required to be filled, while blind microvias on the external layers usually do not have any fill requirements. A stacked microvia is usually filled with electroplated copper to make electrical interconnections between multiple HDI layers and provide structural support for the outer level(s) of the microvia or for a component mounted on the outermost copper pad.

== Microvia reliability ==
The reliability of HDI structure is one of the major constraints for its successful widespread implementation in the PCB industry. Good thermo-mechanical reliability of microvias is an essential part of HDI reliability. Many researchers and professionals have studied the reliability of microvias in HDI PCBs. The reliability of microvias depends on many factors such as microvia geometry parameters, dielectric material properties, and processing parameters.

Microvia reliability research has focused on experimental assessment of the reliability of single-level unfilled microvias, as well as finite element analysis on stress/strain distributions in single-level microvias and microvia fatigue life estimation. Microvia failures identified from the research include interfacial separation (separation between the base of the microvia and the target pad), barrel cracks, corner/knee cracks, and target pad cracks (also referred to as microvia pull out). These failures result from the thermomechanical stresses caused by coefficient of thermal expansion (CTE) mismatch, in the PCB thickness direction, between the metallization in a microvia structure and the dielectric materials surrounding the metal. The following paragraph highlights some of the microvia reliability research.

Ogunjimi et al. looked at the effect of manufacturing and design process variables on the fatigue life of microvias, including trace (conductor) thickness, layer or layers of the dielectric around the trace and in the microvia, via geometry, via wall angle, ductility coefficient of the conductor material, and strain concentration factor. Finite element models were created with different geometries, and ANOVA method was used to determine the significance of the different process variables. The ANOVA results showed that the strain concentration factor was the most important variable, followed with the ductility factor, metallization thickness, and via wall angle. Prabhu et al. conducted a finite element analysis (FEA) on an HDI microvia structure to determine the effect of accelerated temperature cycling and thermal shock. Liu et al. and Ramakrishna et al. conducted liquid-to-liquid and air-to-air thermal shock testing, respectively, to study the effect of dielectric material properties and microvia geometry parameters, such as microvia diameter, wall angle and plating thickness, on microvia reliability. Andrews et al. investigated single-level microvia reliability using IST (interconnect stress test), and considered the effect of reflow cycles of lead-free solder. Wang and Lai investigated the potential failure sites of microvias using finite element modeling. They found that filled microvias have a lower stress than unfilled microvias. Choi and Dasgupta introduced microvia non-destructive inspection method in their work.

Although most microvia reliability research focuses on single-level microvias, Birch tested multiple-level stacked and staggered microvias using IST test. Weibull analysis on the test data showed that single- and 2-level stacked microvias last longer than 3- and 4-level microvias (e. g. 2-level stacked microvias experienced about 20 times more cycles to failure than 4-level stacked microvias).

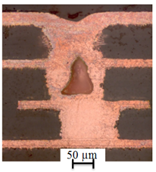
a cross-section view of a microvia with a void

== Microvia voiding ==
One challenge for high density interconnect board development, is to fabricate reliable microvias, especially for stacked microvias, without resulting in incomplete filling, dimples, or voids in the copper plating process. The authors of have been investigating the risk of microvias in terms of voids and other defects using both experimental testing and finite element analysis. They found that incomplete copper filling increases the stress levels in microvias and hence decreases microvia fatigue life.

As for voids, different voiding conditions, such as different void sizes, shapes, and locations result in different effects on microvia reliability. Small voids of a spherical shape lightly increase the microvia fatigue life, but extreme voiding conditions greatly reduce the duration of microvias.
