= Ke Wu =

Canadian professor and researcher

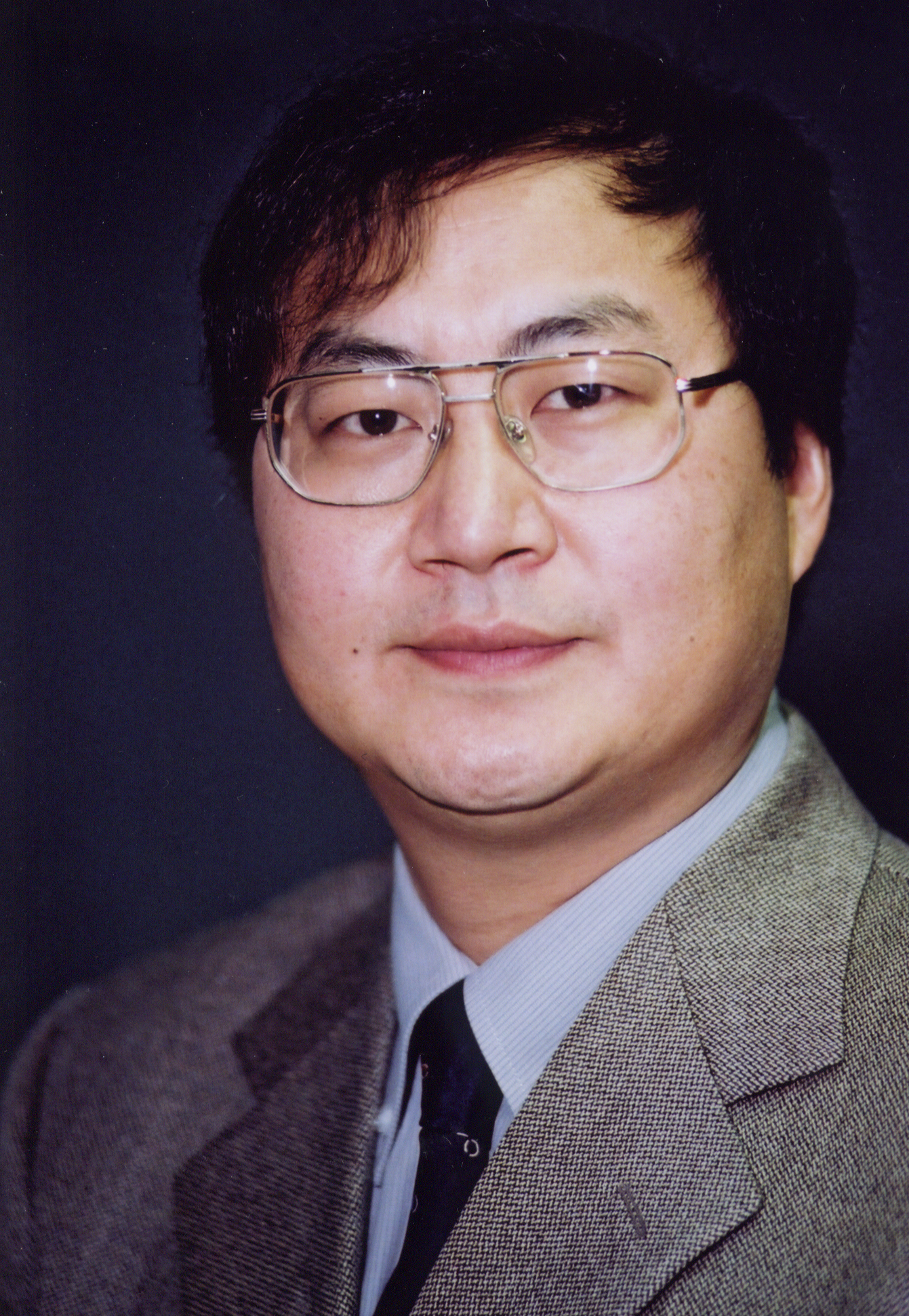
- Born: 9 December 1962 (age 63); Liyang, Jiangsu, China
- Citizenship: Canadian

Academic background
- Education: Institut National Polytechnique de Grenoble, France

Academic work
- Discipline: Physicist, Scientist and Electronic Engineer
- Institutions: École Polytechnique de Montréal; Southeast University, China
- Website: Poly-Grames Research Centre; CREER Quebec

Ke Wu (born 9 December 1962) is a professor and researcher in electrical engineering. He currently works at the Ecole Polytechnique in Montreal, and is a Tier-I Canada Research Chair in radio-frequency (RF) and millimetre-wave engineering.

He is active in the following areas of research: microwave and millimeter wave (components, devices, receiver/transmitter); characterization and measurement of dielectric materials; fast electronics (fast logic circuits, interconnects); superconductors (circuits, applications); numerical modeling (CAD, electromagnetic fields); and optoelectronics (photonics components, broadband transmission).

== Career ==
Wu is the director of the Poly-Grames Research Center, founding director of the Canadian university-industry consortium, Facility for Advanced Millimetre-wave Engineering and the Center for Radiofrequency Electronics Research of Quebec. He was elected an IEEE Fellow in 2001.

In 2020, the National Post published an article stating that Wu is also a researcher at several universities in China, with at least one position being full-time; the National Post also noted that he had in 2011 been a delegate to the Chinese People's Political Consultative Conference (CPPCC), and an advisor to the Overseas Chinese Affairs Office of the Chinese Communist Party's United Front Work Department. Wu subsequently objected to suggestions that he had a parallel academic career in China, calling them "absolute nonsense", and stated that his students would often add his name to other projects exaggerating his role in order to obtain funding. He also said that his role with the CPPCC had been as an "observer".
