= Janina Mazierska =

Polish electrical engineer

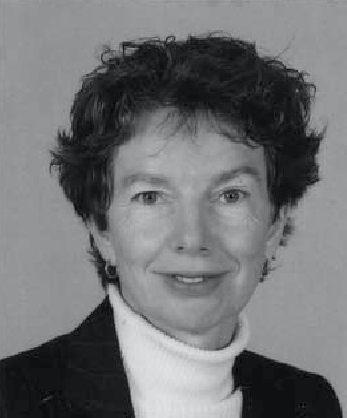
Janina Mazierska

Janina Elżbieta Mazierska (born 28 January 1948) is a Polish microwave engineer known for her work measuring the microwave properties of materials including low-loss dielectrics and high-temperature superconductors. She has worked as a professor in Poland, Nigeria, Australia, and New Zealand, and was the first woman to head the Asia Pacific regional branch of the IEEE.

== Education and career ==
Mazierska was born on 28 January 1948 in Warsaw. She studied electrical engineering at Warsaw University of Technology, earning a master's degree there in 1970 and a Ph.D. in 1979. She worked there as a faculty member from 1970 to 1987 (including a term as a visiting professor at the University of Jos in Nigeria). She moved to James Cook University in Australia in 1987, and held a personal chair there until 2014. She has also been acting dean at James Cook University, and she directed the Institute of Information Sciences and Technology at Massey University in New Zealand from 2004 to 2008.

In 2007 she became director of Region 10 of the IEEE, its subdivision for Asia and the Pacific; she was the first woman to serve in this role. She has also helped found sections of the IEEE in Australia, New Zealand, Vietnam, and China. She is the 2021 chair of the IEEE History Committee.

== Recognition ==
Mazierska was named a Fellow of the IEEE in 2005, "for contributions to measurements of high temperature superconducting and dielectric materials". She is also a recipient of the IEEE Third Millennium Medal, and of the Order of Merit of the Republic of Poland for her "service to the Australian-Polish Community".
