= Dielectric loss =

Electromagnetic energy dissipated by a dielectric

In electrical engineering, dielectric loss is a dielectric material's inherent dissipation of electromagnetic energy (e.g. heat). It can be parameterized in terms of either the loss angle δ or the corresponding loss tangent tan(δ). Both refer to the phasor in the complex plane whose real and imaginary parts are the resistive (lossy) component of an electromagnetic field and its reactive (lossless) counterpart.

== Electromagnetic field perspective ==
For time-varying electromagnetic fields, the electromagnetic energy is typically viewed as waves propagating either through free space, in a transmission line, in a microstrip line, or through a waveguide. Dielectrics are often used in all of these environments to mechanically support electrical conductors and keep them at a fixed separation, or to provide a barrier between different gas pressures yet still transmit electromagnetic power. Maxwell’s equations are solved for the electric and magnetic field components of the propagating waves that satisfy the boundary conditions of the specific environment's geometry. In such electromagnetic analyses, the parameters permittivity ε, permeability μ, and conductivity σ represent the properties of the media through which the waves propagate. The permittivity can have real and imaginary components (the latter excluding σ effects, see below) such that

$$\varepsilon = \varepsilon' - j \varepsilon'' .$$

If we assume that we have a wave function such that

$$\mathbf E = \mathbf E_{o}e^{j \omega t},$$

then Maxwell's curl equation for the magnetic field can be written as:

$$\nabla \times \mathbf H = j \omega \varepsilon' \mathbf E + ( \omega \varepsilon'' + \sigma )\mathbf E$$

where ε′′ is the imaginary component of permittivity attributed to bound charge and dipole relaxation phenomena, which gives rise to energy loss that is indistinguishable from the loss due to the free charge conduction that is quantified by σ. The component ε′ represents the familiar lossless permittivity given by the product of the free space permittivity and the relative real/absolute permittivity, or $\varepsilon' = \varepsilon_0 \varepsilon'_r.$

=== Loss tangent ===
The loss tangent is then defined as the ratio (or angle in a complex plane) of the lossy reaction to the electric field E in the curl equation to the lossless reaction:

$$\tan \delta = \frac{\omega \varepsilon'' + \sigma} {\omega \varepsilon'} .$$

Solution for the electric field of the electromagnetic wave is

$$E = E_o e^{-j k \sqrt{1 - j \tan \delta} z},$$

where:

- $k = \omega \sqrt{\mu \varepsilon'} = \tfrac {2 \pi} {\lambda} ,$
- ω is the angular frequency of the wave, and
- λ is the wavelength in the dielectric material.

For dielectrics with small loss, the square root can be approximated using only the zeroth and first order terms of the binomial expansion. Also, tan δ ≈ δ for small δ.

$$E = E_o e^{- j k \left(1 - j \frac{\tan \delta}{2}\right) z} = E_o e^{-kz\frac{\tan \delta}{2} } e^{-j k z},$$

Since power is electric field intensity squared, it turns out that the power decays with propagation distance z as

$$P = P_o e^{-k z \tan \delta},$$

where:

- P_{o} is the initial power

There are often other contributions to power loss for electromagnetic waves that are not included in this expression, such as due to the wall currents of the conductors of a transmission line or waveguide. Also, a similar analysis could be applied to the magnetic permeability where

$$\mu = \mu' - j \mu'' ,$$

with the subsequent definition of a magnetic loss tangent

$$\tan \delta_m = \frac{\mu''} {\mu'} .$$

The electric loss tangent can be similarly defined:

$$\tan \delta_e = \frac{\varepsilon''} {\varepsilon'} ,$$

upon introduction of an effective dielectric conductivity (see relative permittivity#Lossy medium).

== Discrete circuit perspective ==
A capacitor is a discrete electrical circuit component typically made of a dielectric placed between conductors. One lumped element model of a capacitor includes a lossless ideal capacitor in series with a resistor termed the equivalent series resistance (ESR), as shown in the figure below. The ESR represents losses in the capacitor. In a low-loss capacitor the ESR is very small (the conduction is high leading to a low resistivity), and in a lossy capacitor the ESR can be large. Note that the ESR is not simply the resistance that would be measured across a capacitor by an ohmmeter. The ESR is a derived quantity representing the loss due to both the dielectric's conduction electrons and the bound dipole relaxation phenomena mentioned above. Typically, either conduction electrons or the dipole relaxation dominates the loss in a particular dielectric and manufacturing method. For the case of the conduction electrons being the dominant loss, then

$$\mathrm{ESR} = \frac {\sigma} {\varepsilon' \omega^2 C}$$

where C is the lossless capacitance.

A real capacitor has a lumped element model of a lossless ideal capacitor in series with an equivalent series resistance (ESR). The loss tangent is defined by the angle between the capacitor's impedance vector and the negative reactive axis.

When representing the electrical circuit parameters as vectors in a complex plane, known as phasors, a capacitor's loss tangent is equal to the tangent of the angle between the capacitor's impedance vector and the negative reactive axis, as shown in the adjacent diagram. The loss tangent is then

$$\tan \delta = \frac {\mathrm{ESR}} {|X_{c}|} = \omega C \cdot \mathrm{ESR} = \frac {\sigma} {\varepsilon' \omega}$$.

Since the same AC current flows through both ESR and X_{c}, the loss tangent is also the ratio of the resistive power loss in the ESR to the reactive power oscillating in the capacitor. For this reason, a capacitor's loss tangent is sometimes stated as its dissipation factor, or the reciprocal of its quality factor Q, as follows

$$\tan \delta = \mathrm{DF} = \frac {1} {Q} .$$
