= Monolithic microwave integrated circuit =

Integrated circuit device that operates at microwave frequencies

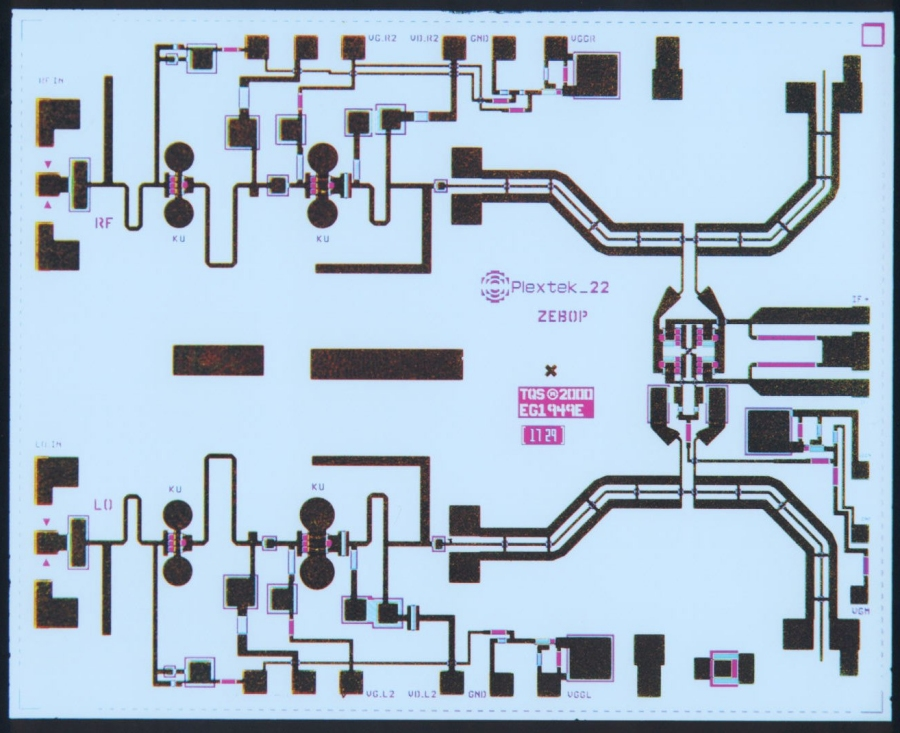
Photograph of a GaAs MMIC (a 2–18 GHz upconverter)

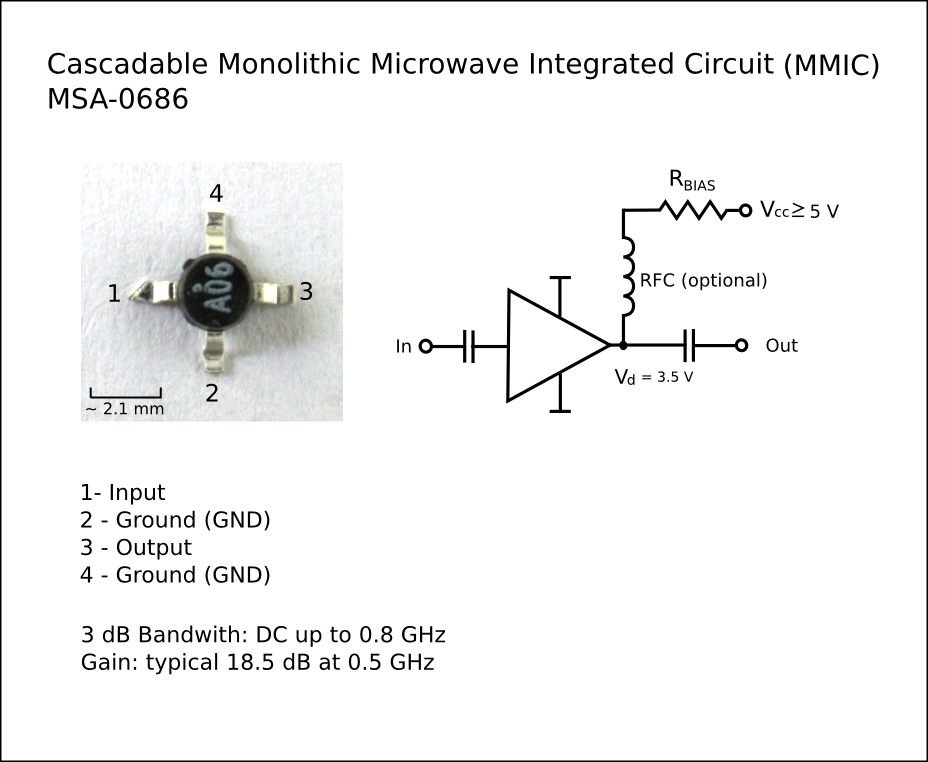
MMIC MSA-0686.

Monolithic microwave integrated circuit, or MMIC (sometimes pronounced "mimic"), is a type of integrated circuit (IC) device that operates at microwave frequencies (300 MHz to 300 GHz). These devices typically perform functions such as microwave mixing, power amplification, low-noise amplification, and high-frequency switching. Inputs and outputs on MMIC devices are frequently matched to a characteristic impedance of 50 ohms. This makes them easier to use, as cascading of MMICs does not then require an external matching network. Additionally, most microwave test equipment is designed to operate in a 50-ohm environment.

MMICs are dimensionally small (from around 1 mm^{2} to 10 mm^{2}) and can be mass-produced, which has allowed the proliferation of high-frequency devices such as cellular phones. MMICs were originally fabricated using gallium arsenide (GaAs), a III-V compound semiconductor. It has two fundamental advantages over silicon (Si), the traditional material for IC realisation: device (transistor) speed and a semi-insulating substrate. Both factors help with the design of high-frequency circuit functions. However, the speed of Si-based technologies has gradually increased as transistor feature sizes have reduced, and MMICs can now also be fabricated in Si technology. The primary advantage of Si technology is its lower fabrication cost compared with GaAs. Silicon wafer diameters are larger (typically 8" to 12" compared with 4" to 8" for GaAs) and the wafer costs are lower, contributing to less expensive IC.

Originally, MMICs used metal-semiconductor field-effect transistors (MESFETs) as the active device. More recently high-electron-mobility transistor (HEMTs), pseudomorphic HEMTs and heterojunction bipolar transistors have become common.

Other III-V technologies, such as indium phosphide (InP), have been shown to offer superior performance to GaAs in terms of gain, higher cutoff frequency, and low noise. However, they also tend to be more expensive due to smaller wafer sizes and increased material fragility.

Silicon germanium (SiGe) is a Si-based compound semiconductor technology offering higher-speed transistors than conventional Si devices but with similar cost advantages.

Gallium nitride (GaN) is also an option for MMICs. Because GaN transistors can operate at much higher temperatures and work at much higher voltages than GaAs transistors, they make ideal power amplifiers at microwave frequencies.

== See also ==
- Hybrid integrated circuit
- Transmission line
