= Ernst Lecher =

Austrian physicist

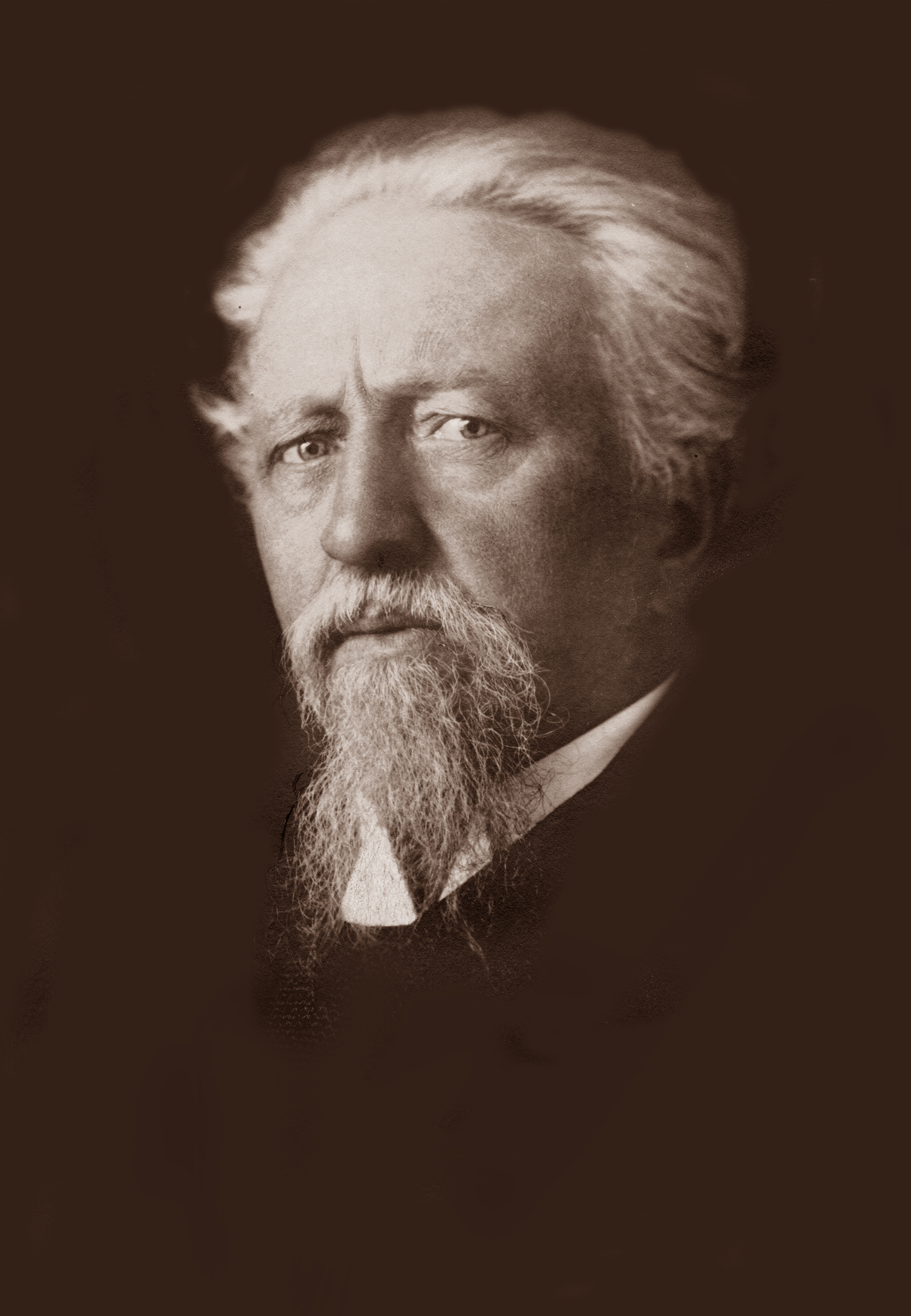
Ernst Lecher (1919)

Ernst Lecher (1 June 1856 – 19 July 1926) was an Austrian physicist who, from 1909, was head of the First Institute of Physics in Vienna. He is remembered for developing an apparatus— "Lecher lines"—to measure the wavelength and frequency of electromagnetic waves. He gave his name to the Ernst-Lecher-Institut, a radar research establishment set up in the 1940s in Reichenau, south of Vienna, which is now a part of the German research institute Max Planck Institute.

Lecher's father, Zacharias K Lecher, was editor of Vienna's leading daily newspaper, Die Presse, and helped to publicise the discovery of X-rays of his German colleague Wilhelm Röntgen in 1896. Lecher's nephew, Konrad Zacharias Lorenz, won the Nobel Prize in Physiology or Medicine in 1973.

== Publications ==
- Studie über elektr. Resonanzerscheinungen, 1890
- Lehrbuch der Physik für Mediziner und Biologen, 1912
