= Geissler tube =

Early gas-discharge lamp

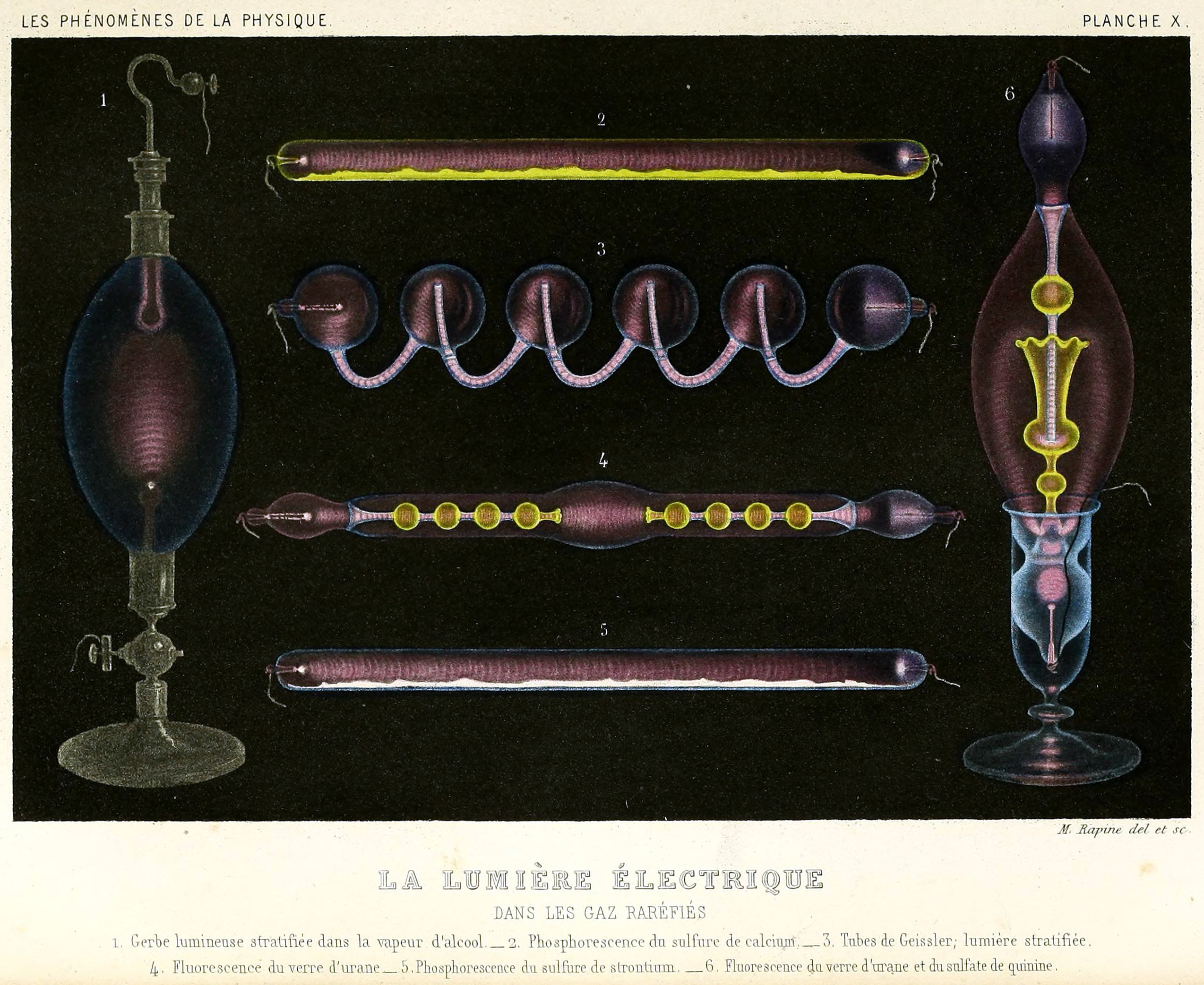
Drawing of Geissler tubes illuminated by their own light, from 1868 French physics book, showing some of the many decorative shapes and colors

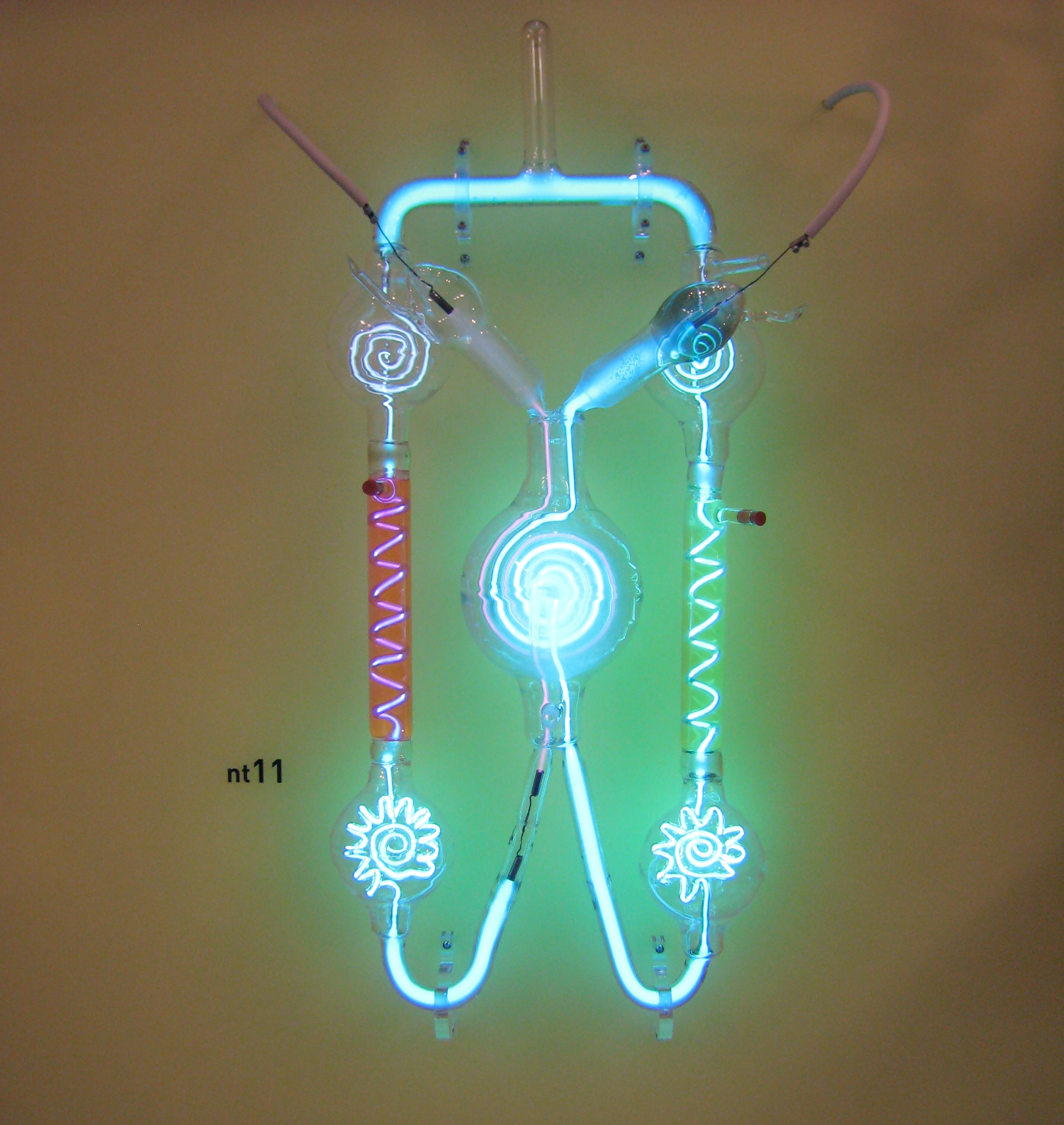
Modern recreation of a Geissler tube in a museum

A Geissler tube is a precursor to modern gas discharge tubes, demonstrating the principles of electrical glow discharge, akin to contemporary neon lights, and central to the discovery of the electron. This device was developed in 1857 by Heinrich Geissler, a German physicist and glassblower. A Geissler tube is composed of a sealed glass cylinder of various shapes, which is partially evacuated and equipped with a metal electrode at each end. It contains rarefied gases—such as neon or argon, air, mercury vapor, or other conductive substances, and sometimes ionizable minerals or metals like sodium. When a high voltage is applied between the electrodes, there is an electric current through the tube, causing gas molecules to ionize by shedding electrons. The free electrons reunite with the ions and the resulting energic atoms emit light, with the emitted color characteristic of the gas.

Colorful decorative Geissler tubes were made in many artistic designs around the turn of the century, to demonstrate the new technology of electricity. Simple straight ones were used as high voltage sensors in physics experiments. The technology of gas-discharge lighting pioneered in Geissler tubes evolved around 1910 into commercial neon lighting, seen today.

== Application ==
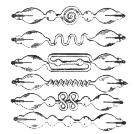
Drawing of typical Geissler tubes from 1911 encyclopedia

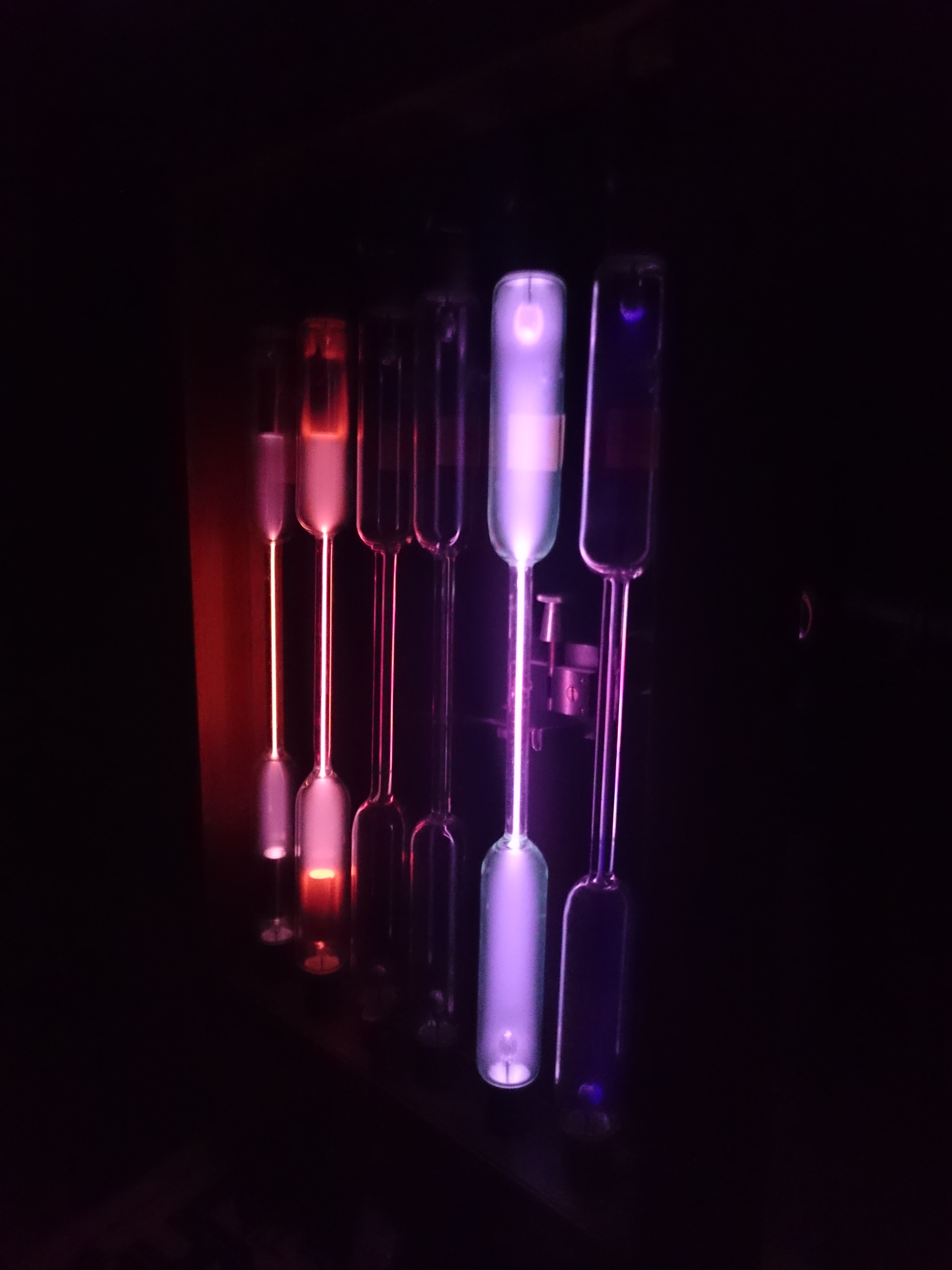
Straight Geissler tubes filled with various gases

Geissler tubes were mass-produced from the 1880s as novelty and entertainment devices, with various spherical chambers and decorative serpentine paths formed into the glass tube. Some tubes were very elaborate and complex in shape and would contain chambers within an outer casing. A novel effect could be obtained by spinning a glowing tube at high speed with a motor; a disk of color was seen due to persistence of vision. When an operating tube was touched by the hand, the shape of the glowing discharge inside often changed due to the capacitance of the body.

Simple straight Geissler tubes were used in early-20th-century scientific research as high voltage indicators. When a Geissler tube was brought near a source of high voltage, alternating current, such as a Tesla coil or Ruhmkorff coil, it would light up even without contact with the circuit. They were used to tune the tank circuits of radio transmitters to resonance. Another example of their use was to find nodes of standing waves on transmission lines, such as Lecher lines used to measure the frequency of early radio transmitters.

Another use around 1900 was as the light source in Pulfrich refractometers.

Geissler tubes are sometimes still used in physics education to demonstrate the principles of gas discharge tubes.

== Influence ==
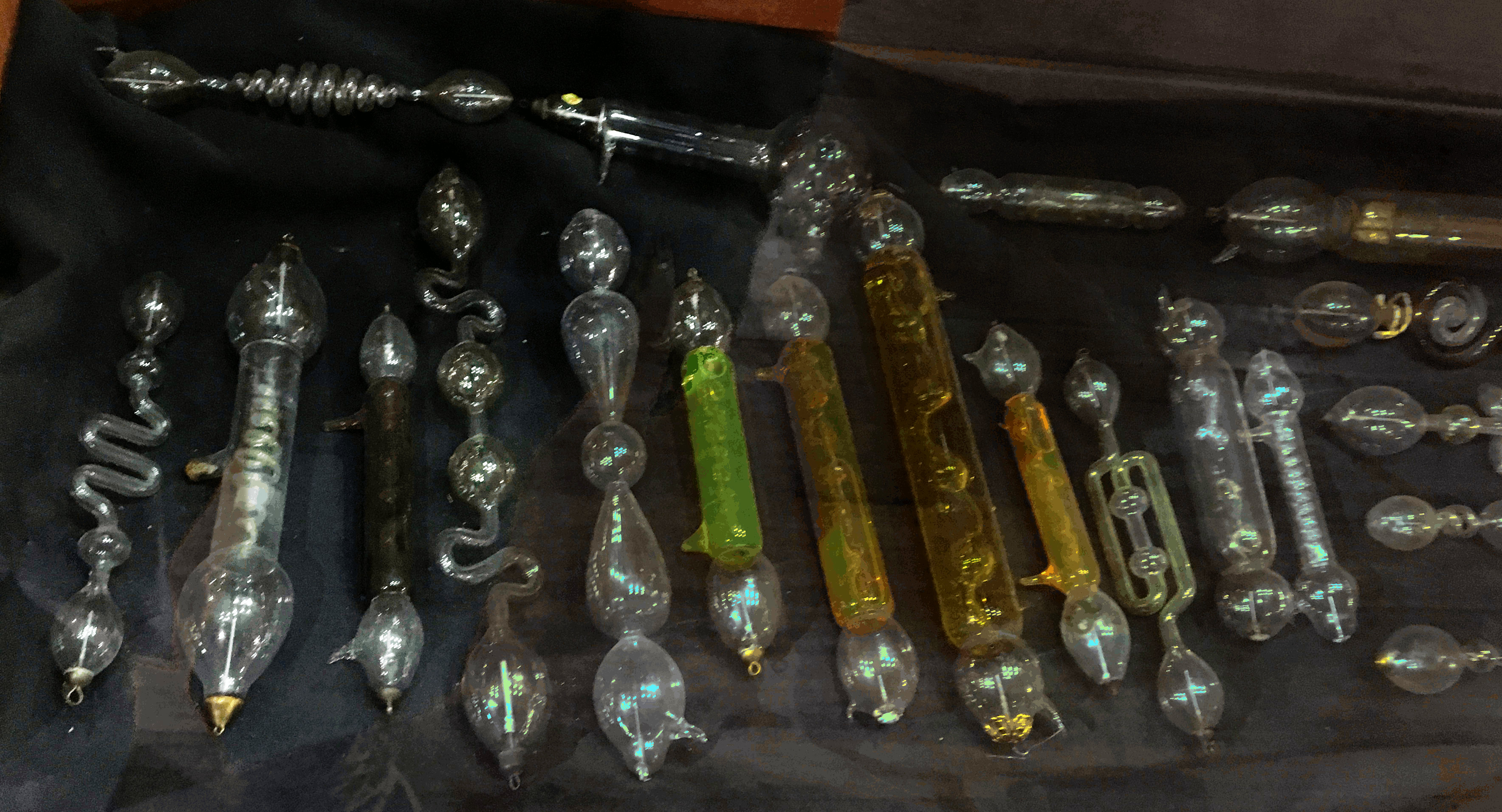
Geissler tubes at museum

Geissler tubes were the first gas discharge tubes, and have had a large impact on the development of many instruments and devices which depend on electric discharge through gases.

One of the most significant consequences of Geissler tube technology was the discovery of the electron and the invention of electronic vacuum tubes. By the 1870s better vacuum pumps enabled scientists to evacuate Geissler tubes to a higher vacuum; these were called Crookes tubes after William Crookes. When current was applied, it was found that the glass envelope of these tubes would glow at the end opposite to the cathode. Observing that sharp-edged shadows were cast on the glowing tube wall by obstructions in the tube in front of the cathode, Johann Hittorf realized that the glow was caused by some type of ray travelling in straight lines through the tube from the cathode. These were named cathode rays. In 1897 J. J. Thomson showed that cathode rays consisted of a previously unknown particle, which was named the electron. The technology of controlling electron beams resulted in the invention of the amplifying vacuum tube in 1907, which created the field of electronics and dominated it for 50 years, and the cathode-ray tube which was used in radar and television displays.

Some of the devices which evolved from Geissler tube technology:

- Vacuum tubes
- Xenon flash lamps (for flash photography)
- Xenon arc lamps (for movie and IMAX projectors)
- X-ray tubes
- Sodium vapor lamps used in streetlights
- "Neon" signs, which use both visible light discharge from neon and other gases and phosphor excitation from ultraviolet light
- Mercury vapor lamps
- Mass spectrometers
- Cathode-ray tubes, employed in the oscilloscope and later in television sets, radar, and computer display devices
- Electrotachyscope (an early moving picture display device)
- Fluorescent lamps
- Plasma globes

== See also ==
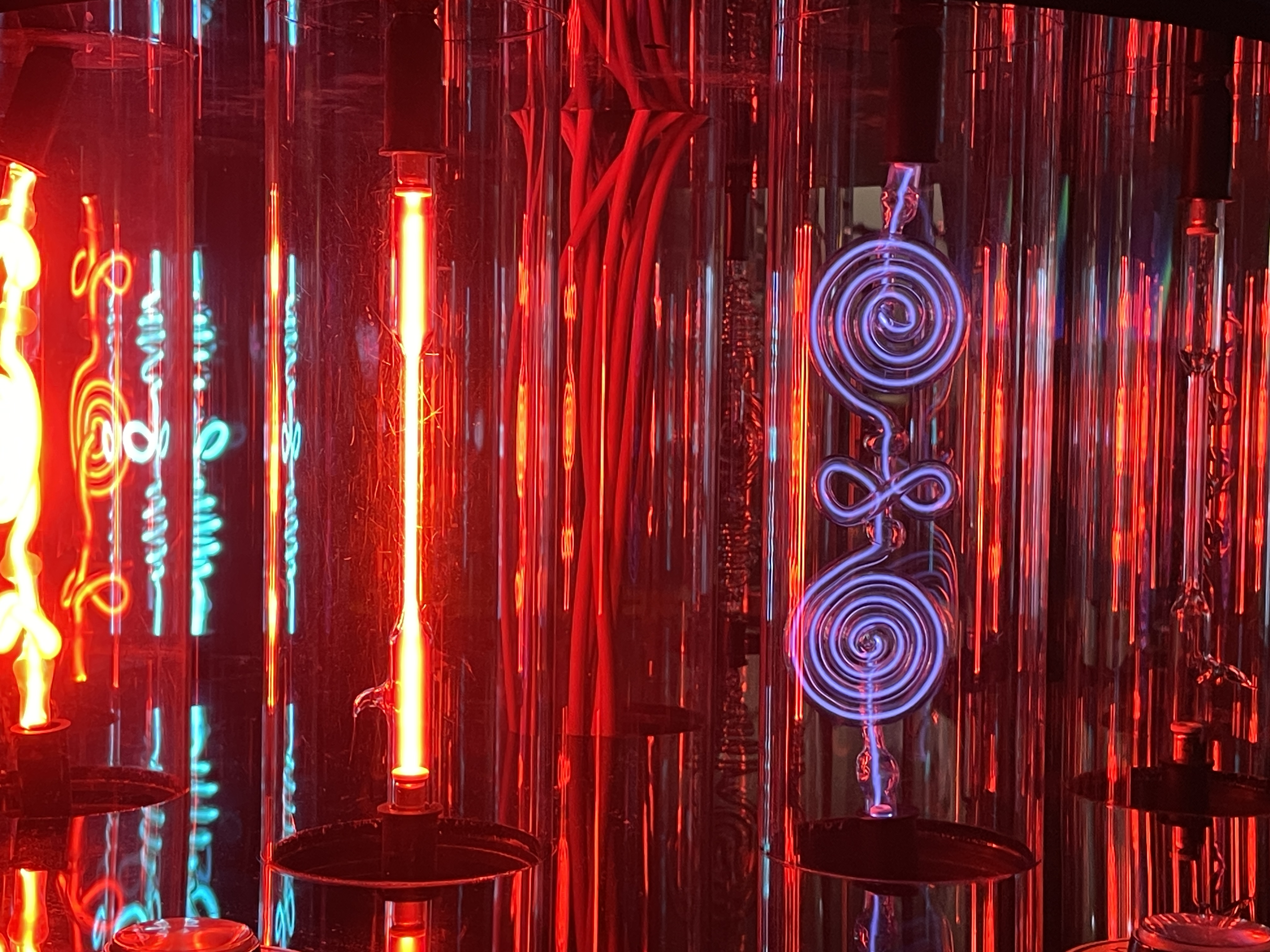
Geissler tubes displayed at the EC1 Science Centre, 2026)

- William Crookes
- Crookes tube
- Induction coil
- Neon sign
- Plasma globe
- X-ray tube
- German inventions and discoveries
