= Square-law detector =

Electronic device

In electronic signal processing, a square law detector is a device that produces an output proportional to the square of some input. For example, in demodulating radio signals, a semiconductor diode can be used as a square law detector, providing an output current proportional to the square of the amplitude of the input voltage over some range of input amplitudes. A square law detector provides an output directly proportional to the power of the input electrical signal.
