= RF and microwave filter =

Class of electronic filter

Radio frequency (RF) and microwave filters represent a class of electronic filter, designed to operate on signals in the megahertz to gigahertz frequency ranges (medium frequency to extremely high frequency). It is a component that is used in electronic systems to pass or reject specific frequencies and attenuate unwanted signals within the microwave and RF range. This frequency range is the range used by most broadcast radio, television, wireless communication (cellphones, Wi-Fi, etc.), and thus most RF and microwave devices will include some kind of filtering on the signals transmitted or received. Such filters are commonly used as building blocks for duplexers and diplexers to combine or separate multiple frequency bands.

== Filter functions ==
Four general filter functions are desirable:

- Band-pass filter: select only a desired band of frequencies
- Band-stop filter: eliminate an undesired band of frequencies
- Low-pass filter: allow only frequencies below a cutoff frequency to pass
- High-pass filter: allow only frequencies above a cutoff frequency to pass

== Filter technologies ==
In general, most RF and microwave filters are most often made up of one or more coupled resonators, and thus any technology that can be used to make resonators can also be used to make filters. The unloaded quality factor of the resonators being used will generally set the selectivity the filter can achieve. The book by Matthaei, Young and Jones provides a good reference to the design and realization of RF and microwave filters. Generalized filter theory operates with resonant frequencies and coupling coefficients of coupled resonators in a microwave filter.

=== Lumped-element LC filters ===
The simplest resonator structure that can be used in RF and microwave filters is an LC tank circuit consisting of parallel or series inductors and capacitors. These have the advantage of being very compact, but the low quality factor of the resonators leads to relatively poor performance.

Lumped-element LC filters have both an upper and lower frequency range. As the frequency gets very low, into the low kHz to Hz range the size of the inductors used in the tank circuit becomes prohibitively large. Very low frequency filters are often designed with crystals to overcome this problem. As the frequency gets higher, into the 600 MHz and higher range, the inductors in the tank circuit become too small to be practical. Since the electrical reactance of an inductor of a certain inductance increases linearly with respect to frequency, at higher frequencies, to achieve the same reactance, a prohibitively low inductance may be required.

=== Planar filters ===
Planar transmission lines, such as microstrip, coplanar waveguide and stripline, can also make good resonators and filters. The processes used to manufacture microstrip circuits is very similar to the processes used to manufacture printed circuit boards and these filters have the advantage of largely being planar.

Precision planar filters are manufactured using a thin-film process. Higher Q factors can be obtained by using low loss tangent dielectric materials for the substrate such as quartz or sapphire and lower resistance metals such as gold.

=== Coaxial filters ===
Coaxial transmission lines provide higher quality factor than planar transmission lines, and are thus used when higher performance is required. The coaxial resonators may make use of high-dielectric constant materials to reduce their overall size.

=== Cavity filters ===
Still widely used in the 40 MHz to 960 MHz frequency range, well constructed cavity filters are capable of high selectivity even under power loads of at least a megawatt. Higher Q quality factor, as well as increased performance stability at closely spaced (down to 75 kHz) frequencies, can be achieved by increasing the internal volume of the filter cavities.

Physical length of conventional cavity filters can vary from over 205 cm in the 40 MHz range, down to under 27.5 cm in the 900 MHz range.

In the microwave range (1000 MHz and up), cavity filters become more practical in terms of size and a significantly higher quality factor than lumped element resonators and filters.

=== Dielectric filters ===
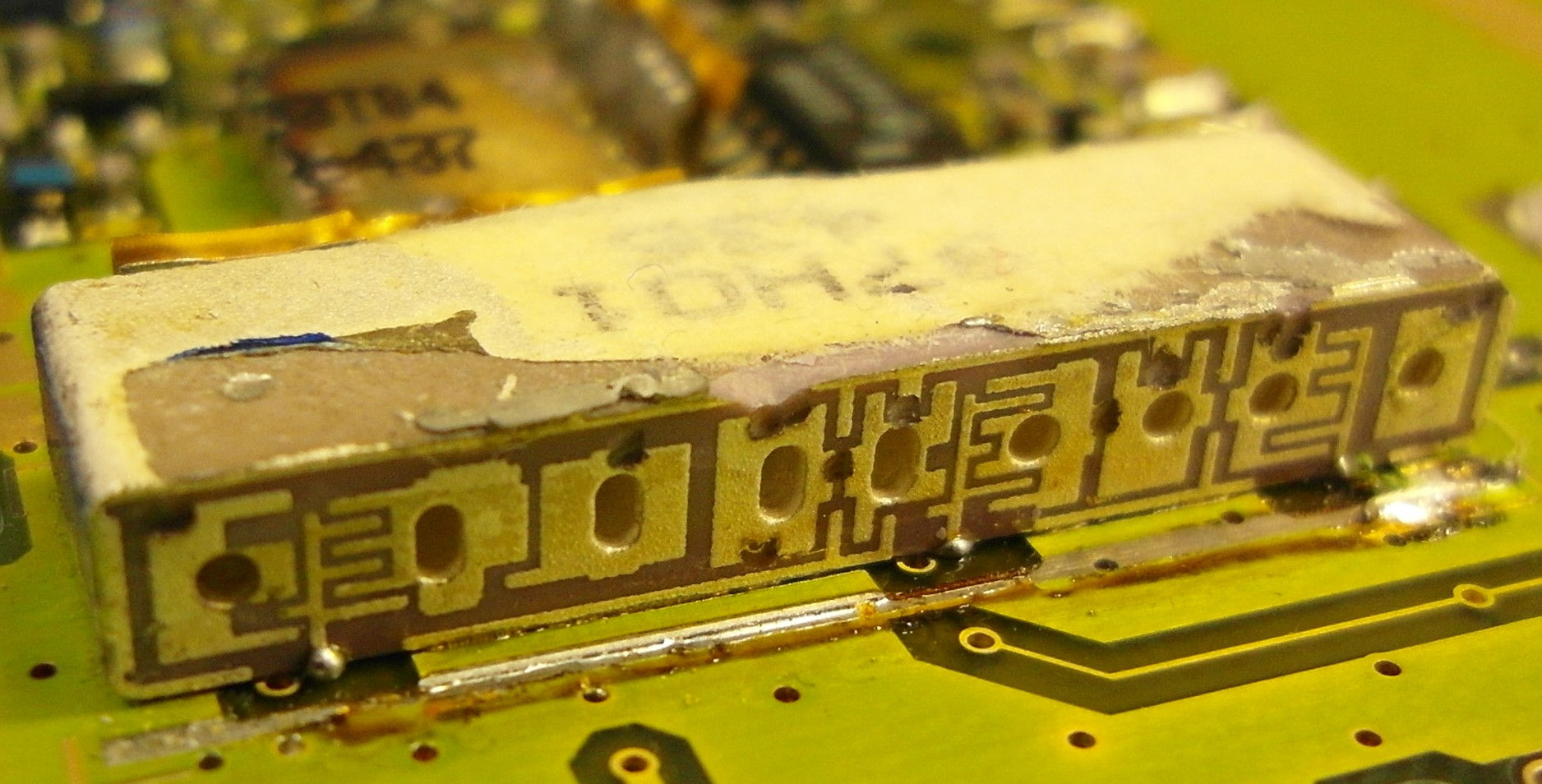
An RF dielectric filter from a 1994 Motorola mobile phone

Pucks made of various dielectric materials can also be used to make resonators. As with the coaxial resonators, high-dielectric constant materials may be used to reduce the overall size of the filter. With low-loss dielectric materials, these can offer significantly higher performance than the other technologies previously discussed.

=== Electroacoustic filters ===
Electroacoustic resonators based on piezoelectric materials can be used for filters. Since acoustic wavelength at a given frequency is several orders of magnitude shorter than the electrical wavelength, electroacoustic resonators are generally smaller by size and weight than electromagnetic counterparts such as cavity resonators.

A common example of an electroacoustic resonator is the quartz resonator which essentially is a cut of a piezoelectric quartz crystal clamped by a pair of electrodes. This technology is limited to some tens of megahertz. For microwave frequencies, typically more than 100 MHz, most filters are using thin film technologies such as surface acoustic wave (SAW) and, thin-film bulk acoustic resonator (FBAR, TFBAR) based structures.

=== Waveguide filter ===
The waffle-iron filter is an example.

=== Energy tunneling-based filters ===
These are the new class of highly tunable microwave filters. These special kinds of filters can be implemented on waveguides, SIW or on low-cost PCB technology and can be tuned to any lower or higher frequency with the help of switches inserted at appropriate positions to achieve a broad tuning range.
