= Achieser–Zolotarev filter =

Class of signal processing filter

Achieser–Zolotarev filter, or just Zolotarev filter is a class of signal processing filter based on Zolotarev polynomials. Achieser is spelled as "Akhiezer" in some sources. The filter response is similar to the Chebychev filter except that the first ripple is larger than the rest. The filter is especially useful in some waveguide applications.

== Naming ==
The filter is named after Yegor Ivanovich Zolotarev who, in 1868, introduced the Zolotarev polynomials which are used as the basis of this filter. Zolotarev's work on approximation theory was further developed by Naum Akhiezer in 1956. Zolotarev polynomials were first applied to the design of filters by Ralph Levy in 1970.

== Properties ==
Comparison of passband insertion loss of 7th-order Achieser–Zolotarev and Chebyshev filters

Achieser–Zolotarev filters have similar properties to Chebyshev filters of the first kind. In fact, Chebyshev polynomials are a special case of Zolotarev polynomials, so Chebyshev filters can be considered a special case of Achieser–Zolotarev filter.

Like the Chebyshev filter, the Achieser–Zolotarev filter has equal ripple attenuation in the passband. The essential difference is that the first peak in attenuation of the Achieser–Zolotarev filter is greater than the design preset ripple for the other peaks.

An inverse Zolotarev filter (type II Zolotarev filter) is possible using the reciprocal of the Zolotarev polynomial instead. This procedure is the same as that for the inverse Chebyshev filter, and like that filter, this filter will have all the ripple in the stopband and a monotonic passband. The inverse Zolotarev filter has equiripple in the stopband except for the last peak with increasing frequency. This is a peak of minimum attenuation (maximum gain) rather than a peak of maximum attenuation.

== Uses ==
Waveguide filter designs sometimes use the Achieser–Zolotarev response as low-pass filters. It is used in this role because it provides a better impedance match than the more common Chebyshev filter. The higher attenuation at the very lowest frequencies is acceptable in waveguide filters because in this medium there is always a guide cutoff frequency below which waves cannot propagate anyway. The region of high attenuation of the Achieser–Zolotarev filter can be made to occur below the guide cutoff frequency, in which case the response is indistinguishable from a low-pass response because the low-frequency attenuation is masked by the guide cutoff effect. As with the Chebychev filter, the designer of an Achieser–Zolotarev filter can exchange increased steepness of the transition band for more passband ripple.

The advantage of the Zolotarev response is that it results in a filter with a better impedance match to the connecting waveguides compared to the Chebyshev filter or image-parameter filters. Waveguide filters will usually require stepped impedance matching at their input and output. This is especially true of corrugated waveguide designs such as the waffle-iron filter which have a high input impedance compared to the waveguide to which it is connected. A better match results in fewer impedance steps being required and a significant reduction in bulk and weight. Waveguide designs are very bulky compared to other technologies but are preferred for microwave high-power applications and where low loss is needed. In applications such as airborne radar, weight and bulk are important considerations.

There is a further advantage of the Achieser–Zolotarev filter over the Chebyshev in distributed-element filter designs. The dimensions of the elements of the Achieser–Zolotarev tend to be more convenient to manufacture. Internal gaps tend to be larger and the impedance changes tend to be smaller (making for a smaller change in mechanical dimensions). These same features increase the power-handling capability of the assembly.

An adaptation of the Achieser–Zolotarev filter has applications for enhancement and restoration of images and video. In this role 2-D FIR filters are required of the bandstop filter form with extremely narrow stopbands. Such filters can be adapted from a 1-D Achieser–Zolotarev filter.

== See also ==
- Elliptic filter (Cauer filter), occasionally called a Zolotarev filter.

== Bibliography ==
- Bowen, E.G.; et al. (CSIRO Radiophysics Laboratory staff) (1954). A Textbook of Radar. Cambridge University Press. OCLC 706070977..
- Cameron, Richard J.; Kudsia, Chandra M.; Mansour, Raafat R. (2018). Microwave Filters for Communication Systems. John Wiley & Sons. ISBN 978-1118274347.
- Grebennikov, Andre (2011). RF and Microwave Transmitter Design. John Wiley & Sons. ISBN 978-0470934654..
- Hansen, Robert C. (2009). Phased Array Antennas. Wiley. ISBN 978-0470529171..
- Levy, Ralph (August 1973). "Tapered corrugated waveguide low-pass filters". IEEE Transactions on Microwave Theory and Techniques. 21 (8): 526–532. Bibcode:1973ITMTT..21..526L. doi:10.1109/TMTT.1973.1128052.
- Morgan, Matthew A. (2017). Reflectionless Filters. Artech House. ISBN 978-1630814052..
- Newman, D.J.; Reddy, A.R. (April 1980). "Rational approximations to $x^n$ II". Canadian Journal of Mathematics. 32 (2): 310–316. doi:10.4153/CJM-1980-023-9.
- Nwajana, Augustine Onyenwe; Yeo, Kenneth Siok Kiam (2020). Practical Approach to Substrate Integrated Waveguide (SIW) Diplexer. IGI Global. ISBN 978-1799820864..
- Pinkus, Allan (2001). "Zolotarev polynomials". In Hazewinkel, Michiel (ed.). Encyclopaedia of Mathematics, Supplement III. Springer Science & Business Media. ISBN 1402001983.
- Zahradnik, Pavel; Vlček, Miroslav (2004). "Analytical design of 2-D narrow bandstop FIR filters". In Bubak, Marian; van Albada, Geert D.; Sloot, Peter M.A.; Dongarra, Jack (eds.). Computational Science — ICCS 2004: Proceedings of the 4th International Conference. Springer Science & Business Media. pp. 56–63. ISBN 3540221298..
