= Zolotarev polynomials =

Polynomials used in approximation theory

In mathematics, Zolotarev polynomials are polynomials used in approximation theory. They are sometimes used as an alternative to the Chebyshev polynomials where accuracy of approximation near the origin is of less importance. Zolotarev polynomials differ from the Chebyshev polynomials in that two of the coefficients are fixed in advance rather than allowed to take on any value. The Chebyshev polynomials of the first kind are a special case of Zolotarev polynomials. These polynomials were introduced by Russian mathematician Yegor Ivanovich Zolotarev in 1868.

== Definition and properties ==
Zolotarev polynomials of degree $n$ in $x$ are of the form

$$Z_n(x,\sigma) = x^n -\sigma x^{n-1} + \cdots + a_k x^k + \cdots + a_0 \ ,$$

where $\sigma$ is a prescribed value for $a_{n-1}$ and the $a_k \in \mathbb R$ are otherwise chosen such that the deviation of $Z_n(x)$ from zero is minimum in the interval $[-1,1]$.

A subset of Zolotarev polynomials can be expressed in terms of Chebyshev polynomials of the first kind, $T_n(x)$. For

$$0 \le \sigma \le \dfrac {1}{n} \tan^2 \dfrac {\pi}{2n}$$

then

$$Z_n(x,\sigma) = (1 + \sigma)^n T_n \left ( \frac {x - \sigma}{1 + \sigma} \right ) \ .$$

For values of $\sigma$ greater than the maximum of this range, Zolotarev polynomials can be expressed in terms of elliptic functions. For $\sigma=0$, the Zolotarev polynomial is identical to the equivalent Chebyshev polynomial. For negative values of $\sigma$, the polynomial can be found from the polynomial of the positive value,

$$Z_n(x,-\sigma) = (-1)^n Z_n(-x,\sigma) \ .$$

The Zolotarev polynomial can be expanded into a sum of Chebyshev polynomials using the relationship

$$Z_n(x) = \sum^n_{k=0} a_k T_k (x) \ .$$

Zolotarev polynomial of the 8th degree (left) and of the 9th degree (right). The x scale is marked as prototype frequency, as would be done when using the polynomial in a filter design.

=== In terms of Jacobi elliptic functions ===
The original solution to the approximation problem given by Zolotarev was in terms of Jacobi elliptic functions. Zolotarev gave the general solution where the number of zeroes to the left of the peak value ($q$) in the interval $[-1,1]$ is not equal to the number of zeroes to the right of this peak ($p$). The degree of the polynomial is $n=p+q$. For many applications, $p=q$ is used and then only $n$ need be considered. The general Zolotarev polynomials are defined as

$$Z_n(x|\kappa) = \frac {(-1)^p}{2} \left [ \left ( \dfrac {H(u-v)}{H(u+v)} \right )^n + \left ( \dfrac {H(u+v)}{H(u-v)} \right )^n \right ]$$

where
$$u = F \left ( \left . \operatorname{sn} \left ( \left. v \right |\kappa \right ) \sqrt { \dfrac {1+x}{x + 2 \operatorname{sn}^2 \left ( \left . v \right | \kappa \right ) -1}} \right | \kappa \right )$$
$$v = \dfrac {p}{n} K(\kappa)$$
$H(\varphi)$ is the Jacobi eta function
$F(\varphi|\kappa)$ is the incomplete elliptic integral of the first kind
$K(\kappa)$ is the quarter-wave complete elliptic integral of the first kind. That is, $K(\kappa)=F \left ( \left . \frac{\pi}{2} \right| \kappa \right)$
$\kappa$ is the Jacobi elliptic modulus
$\operatorname{sn} (\varphi|\kappa)$ is the Jacobi elliptic sine.

The variation of the function within the interval [−1,1] is equiripple except for one peak which is larger than the rest. The position and width of this peak can be set independently. The position of the peak is given by

$x_\text {max} = 1 - 2 \operatorname {sn}^2 (v|\kappa) + 2 \dfrac {\operatorname {sn} (v|\kappa) \operatorname {cn} (v|\kappa)}{\operatorname {dn} (v|\kappa)} Z(v|\kappa)$

where
$\operatorname{cn} (\varphi|\kappa)$ is the Jacobi elliptic cosine
$\operatorname{dn} (\varphi|\kappa)$ is the Jacobi delta amplitude
$Z(\varphi|\kappa)$ is the Jacobi zeta function
$v$ is as defined above.

The height of the peak is given by

$Z_n(x_\text {max}|\kappa) = \cosh 2n \bigl ( \sigma_\text {max} Z(v|\kappa) - \varPi (\sigma_\text {max},v|\kappa) \bigr )$

where
$\varPi (\phi_1,\phi_2|\kappa)$ is the incomplete elliptic integral of the third kind
$$\sigma_\text {max} = F \left ( \left . \sin^{-1} \left ( \dfrac {1}{\kappa \operatorname {sn} (v|\kappa)} \sqrt \dfrac {x_\text {max} - x_\mathrm L}{x_\text {max} + 1} \right ) \right | \kappa \right )$$
$x_\mathrm L$ is the position on the left limb of the peak which is the same height as the equiripple peaks.

==== Jacobi eta function ====
The Jacobi eta function can be defined in terms of a Jacobi auxiliary theta function,

$H(\varphi|\kappa) = \theta_1 (a|b)$

where,
$$a = \frac {\pi \varphi}{2K'(\kappa)}$$
$$b = \exp \left ( - \frac {\pi K'(\kappa)}{K(\kappa)} \right )$$
$K'(\kappa) = K(\sqrt{1 - \kappa^2}) \ .$

== Applications ==
The polynomials were introduced by Yegor Ivanovich Zolotarev in 1868 as a means of uniformly approximating polynomials of degree $x^{n+1}$ on the interval [−1,1]. Pafnuty Chebyshev had shown in 1858 that $x^{n+1}$ could be approximated in this interval with a polynomial of degree at most $n$ with an error of $2^{-n}$. In 1868, Zolotarev showed that $x^{n+1} - \sigma x^n$ could be approximated with a polynomial of degree at most $n-1$, two degrees lower. The error in Zolotarev's method is given by,

$$2^{-n} \left ( \dfrac {1 + \sigma}{1+n} \right )^{n+1} \ .$$

The procedure was further developed by Naum Achieser in 1956.

Zolotarev polynomials are used in the design of Achieser-Zolotarev filters. They were first used in this role in 1970 by Ralph Levy in the design of microwave waveguide filters. Achieser-Zolotarev filters are similar to Chebyshev filters in that they have an equal ripple attenuation through the passband, except that the attenuation exceeds the preset ripple for the peak closest to the origin.

Zolotarev polynomials can be used to synthesise the radiation patterns of linear antenna arrays, first suggested by D.A. McNamara in 1985. The work was based on the filter application with beam angle used as the variable instead of frequency. The Zolotarev beam pattern has equal-level sidelobes.

== Bibliography ==
- Achiezer (Akhiezer), N.I. (2013) [1956]. Theory of approximation. Translated by Hyman, C.J. Dover. ISBN 978-0-486-15313-1. OCLC 1067500225.
- Beebe, Nelson H.F. (2017). "Elliptic integral functions". The Mathematical-Function Computation Handbook. Springer. pp. 619–692. doi:10.1007/978-3-319-64110-2_20. ISBN 978-3-319-64110-2.
- Cameron, Richard J.; Kudsia, Chandra M.; Mansour, Raafat R. (2018). "12. Waveguide and Coaxial Lowpass Filters". Microwave Filters for Communication Systems (2nd ed.). Wiley. pp. 395–426. doi:10.1002/9781119292371.ch12. ISBN 978-1-119-29237-1.
- Hansen, Robert C. (2009). "3. Linear Array Pattern Synthesis". Phased Array Antennas (2nd ed.). Wiley. pp. 49–107. doi:10.1002/9780470529188.ch3. ISBN 978-0-470-52918-8.
- McNamara, D.A. (August 1985). "Optimum monopulse linear array excitations using Zolotarev Polynomials". Electron. 21 (16): 681–2. doi:10.1049/el_19850482 (inactive 7 November 2026).
- Newman, D.J.; Reddy, A.R. (April 1980). "Rational approximations to $x^n$ II". Canadian Journal of Mathematics. 32 (2): 310–6. doi:10.4153/CJM-1980-023-9.
- Pinkus, Allan (2001). "Z. §Zolotarev polynomials". In Hazewinkel, M. (ed.). Supplement III. Encyclopaedia of Mathematics. Springer. pp. 448–465. doi:10.1007/978-0-306-48373-8_24. ISBN 978-0-306-48373-8.
- Vlček, Miroslav; Unbehauen, Rolf (March 1999). "Zolotarev polynomials and optimal FIR filters". IEEE Transactions on Signal Processing. 47 (3): 717–730. Bibcode:1999ITSP...47..717V. doi:10.1109/78.747778. (corrections July 2000).
- Zahradnik, P.; Vlček, M. (2004). "Analytical Design of 2-D Narrow Bandstop FIR Filters". In Bubak, M.; van Albada, G.D.; Sloot, P.M.A.; Dongarra, J. (eds.). Computational Science — ICCS 2004. Lecture Notes in Computer Science. Vol. 3039. Springer. doi:10.1007/978-3-540-25944-2_8. ISBN 978-3-540-25944-2.
