= Distributed-element circuit =

Transmission line-based electrical circuit

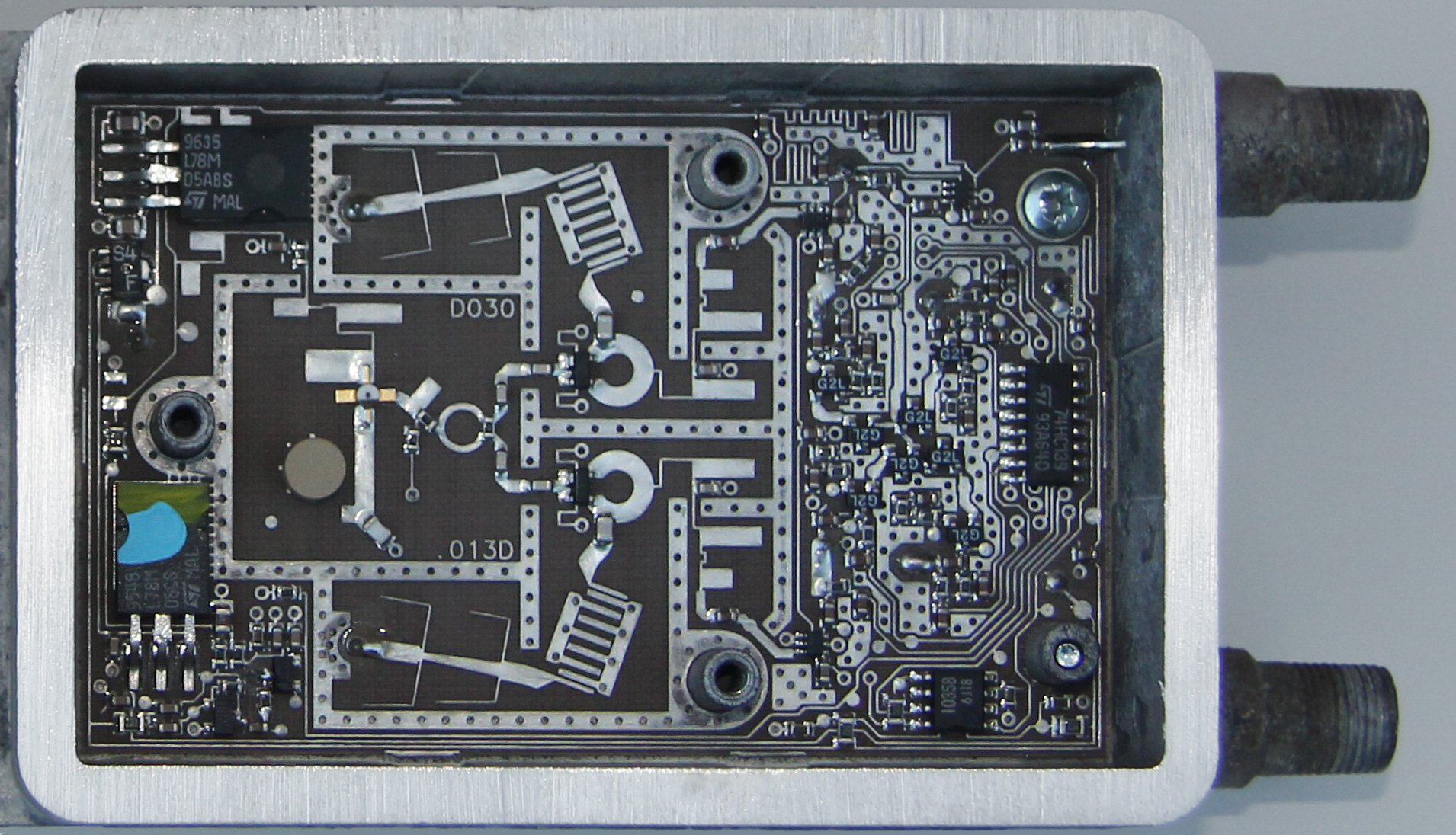
A low-noise block converter with distributed elements. The circuitry on the right is lumped elements. The distributed-element circuitry is centre and left of centre, and is constructed in microstrip.

Distributed-element circuits are electrical circuits composed of lengths of transmission lines or other distributed components. These circuits perform the same functions as conventional circuits composed of passive components, such as capacitors, inductors, and transformers. They are used mostly at microwave frequencies, where conventional components are difficult (or impossible) to implement.

Conventional circuits consist of individual components manufactured separately then connected together with a conducting medium. Distributed-element circuits are built by forming the medium itself into specific patterns. A major advantage of distributed-element circuits is that they can be produced cheaply as a printed circuit board for consumer products, such as satellite television. They are also made in coaxial and waveguide formats for applications such as radar, satellite communication, and microwave links.

A phenomenon commonly used in distributed-element circuits is that a length of transmission line can be made to behave as a resonator. Distributed-element components which do this include stubs, coupled lines, and cascaded lines. Circuits built from these components include filters, power dividers, directional couplers, and circulators.

Distributed-element circuits were studied during the 1920s and 1930s but did not become important until World War II, when they were used in radar. After the war their use was limited to military, space, and broadcasting infrastructure, but improvements in materials science in the field soon led to broader applications. They can now be found in domestic products such as satellite dishes and mobile phones.

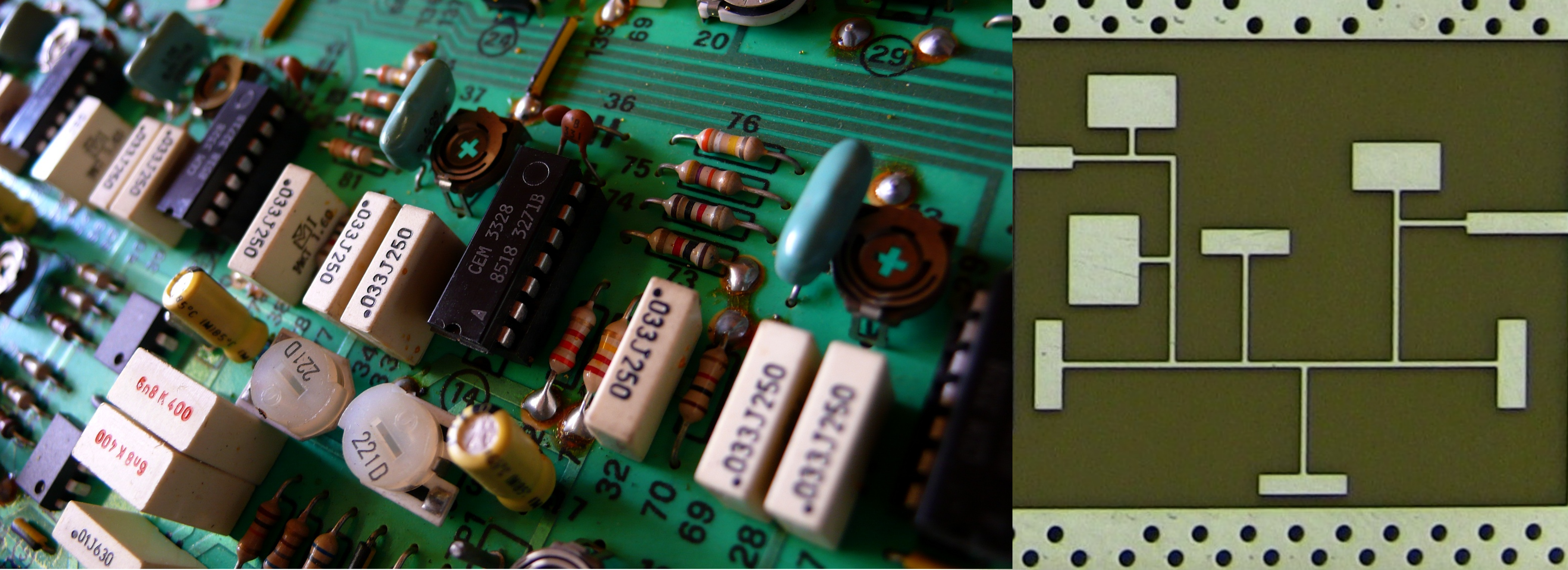
A low-pass filter as conventional discrete components connected on a printed circuit board (left), and as a distributed-element design printed on the board itself (right)

== Circuit modelling ==
Distributed-element circuits are designed with the distributed-element model, an alternative to the lumped-element model in which the passive electrical elements of electrical resistance, capacitance and inductance are assumed to be "lumped" at one point in space in a resistor, capacitor or inductor, respectively. The distributed-element model is used when this assumption no longer holds, and these properties are considered to be distributed in space. The assumption breaks down when there is significant time for electromagnetic waves to travel from one terminal of a component to the other; "significant", in this context, implies enough time for a noticeable phase change. The amount of phase change is dependent on the wave's frequency (and inversely dependent on wavelength). A common rule of thumb amongst engineers is to change from the lumped to the distributed model when distances involved are more than one-tenth of a wavelength (a 36° phase change). The lumped model completely fails at one-quarter wavelength (a 90° phase change), with not only the value, but the nature of the component not being as predicted. Due to this dependence on wavelength, the distributed-element model is used mostly at higher frequencies; at low frequencies, distributed-element components are too bulky. Distributed designs are feasible above 300 MHz, and are the technology of choice at microwave frequencies above 1 GHz.

There is no clear-cut demarcation in the frequency at which these models should be used. Although the changeover is usually somewhere in the 100–500 MHz range, the technological scale is also significant; miniaturised circuits can use the lumped model at a higher frequency. Printed circuit boards (PCBs) using through-hole technology are larger than equivalent designs using surface-mount technology. Hybrid integrated circuits are smaller than PCB technologies, and monolithic integrated circuits are smaller than both. Integrated circuits can use lumped designs at higher frequencies than printed circuits, and this is done in some radio frequency integrated circuits. This choice is particularly significant for hand-held devices, because lumped-element designs generally result in a smaller product.

=== Construction with transmission lines ===
Frequency response of a fifth-order Chebyshev filter constructed from lumped (top) and distributed components (bottom)

The overwhelming majority of distributed-element circuits are composed of lengths of transmission line, a particularly simple form to model. The cross-sectional dimensions of the line are unvarying along its length, and are small compared to the signal wavelength; thus, only distribution along the length of the line need be considered. Such an element of a distributed circuit is entirely characterised by its length and characteristic impedance. A further simplification occurs in commensurate line circuits, where all the elements are the same length. With commensurate circuits, a lumped circuit design prototype consisting of capacitors and inductors can be directly converted into a distributed circuit with a one-to-one correspondence between the elements of each circuit.

Commensurate line circuits are important because a design theory for producing them exists; no general theory exists for circuits consisting of arbitrary lengths of transmission line (or any arbitrary shapes). Although an arbitrary shape can be analysed with Maxwell's equations to determine its behaviour, finding useful structures is a matter of trial and error or guesswork.

An important difference between distributed-element circuits and lumped-element circuits is that the frequency response of a distributed circuit periodically repeats as shown in the Chebyshev filter example; the equivalent lumped circuit does not. This is a result of the transfer function of lumped forms being a rational function of complex frequency; distributed forms are an irrational function. Another difference is that cascade-connected lengths of line introduce a fixed delay at all frequencies (assuming an ideal line). There is no equivalent in lumped circuits for a fixed delay, although an approximation could be constructed for a limited frequency range.

== Advantages and disadvantages ==
Distributed-element circuits are cheap and easy to manufacture in some formats, but take up more space than lumped-element circuits. This is problematic in mobile devices (especially hand-held ones), where space is at a premium. If the operating frequencies are not too high, the designer may miniaturise components rather than switching to distributed elements. However, parasitic elements and resistive losses in lumped components are greater with increasing frequency as a proportion of the nominal value of the lumped-element impedance. In some cases, designers may choose a distributed-element design (even if lumped components are available at that frequency) to benefit from improved quality. Distributed-element designs tend to have greater power-handling capability; with a lumped component, all the energy passed by a circuit is concentrated in a small volume.

== Media ==
=== Paired conductors ===
Several types of transmission line exist, and any of them can be used to construct distributed-element circuits. The oldest (and still most widely used) is a pair of conductors; its most common form is twisted pair, used for telephone lines and Internet connections. It is not often used for distributed-element circuits because the frequencies used are lower than the point where distributed-element designs become advantageous. However, designers frequently begin with a lumped-element design and convert it to an open-wire distributed-element design. Open wire is a pair of parallel uninsulated conductors used, for instance, for telephone lines on telegraph poles. The designer does not usually intend to implement the circuit in this form; it is an intermediate step in the design process. Distributed-element designs with conductor pairs are limited to a few specialised uses, such as Lecher lines and the twin-lead used for antenna feed lines.

=== Coaxial ===
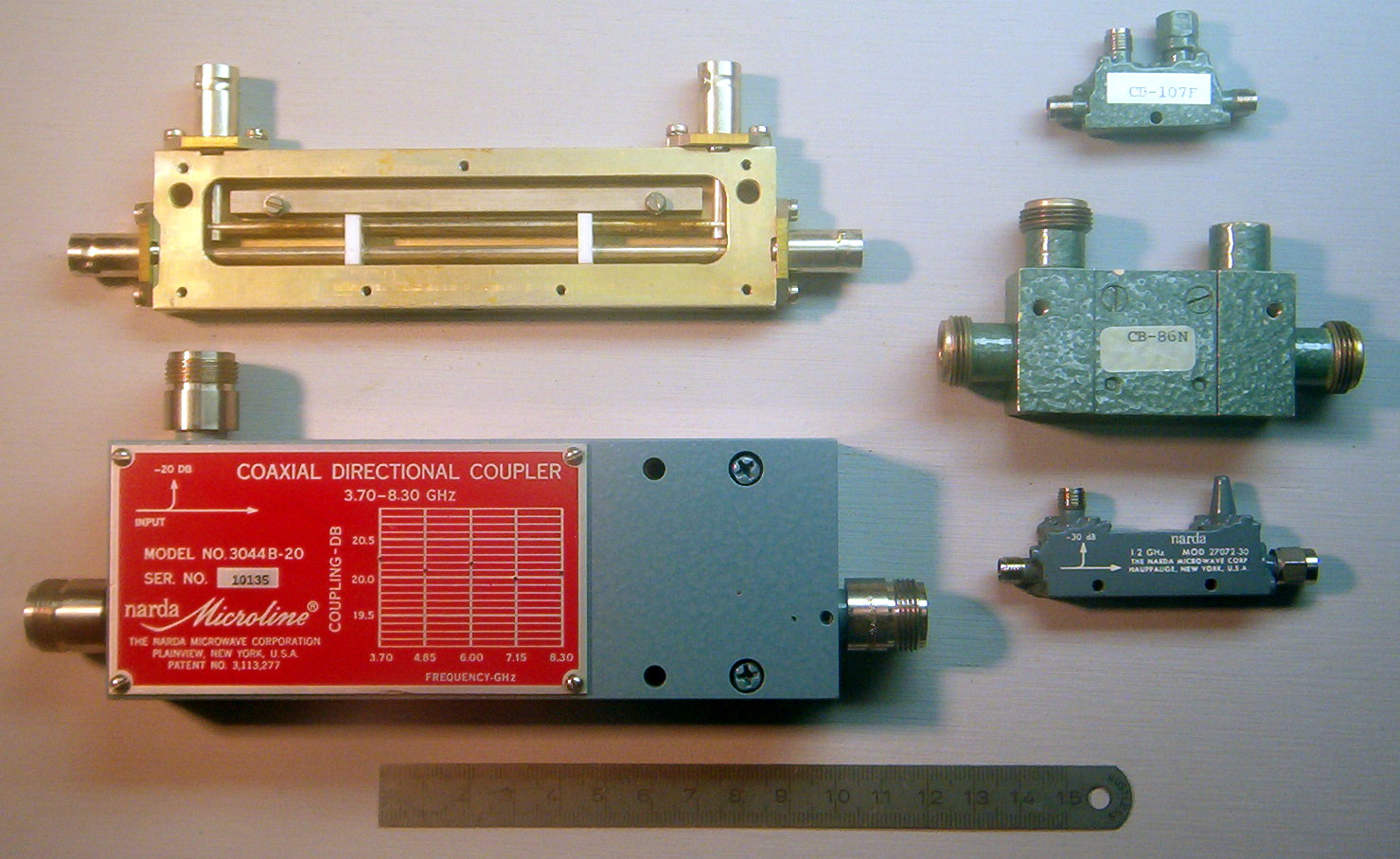
A collection of coaxial directional couplers. One has the cover removed, showing its internal structure.

Coaxial line, a centre conductor surrounded by an insulated shielding conductor, is widely used for interconnecting units of microwave equipment and for longer-distance transmissions. Although coaxial distributed-element devices were commonly manufactured during the second half of the 20th century, they have been replaced in many applications by planar forms due to cost and size considerations. Air-dielectric coaxial line is used for low-loss and high-power applications. Distributed-element circuits in other media still commonly transition to coaxial connectors at the circuit ports for interconnection purposes.

=== Planar ===
The majority of modern distributed-element circuits use planar transmission lines, especially those in mass-produced consumer items. There are several forms of planar line, but the kind known as microstrip is the most common. It can be manufactured by the same process as printed circuit boards and hence is cheap to make. It also lends itself to integration with lumped circuits on the same board. Other forms of printed planar lines include stripline, finline and many variations. Planar lines can also be used in monolithic microwave integrated circuits, where they are integral to the device chip.

=== Waveguide ===
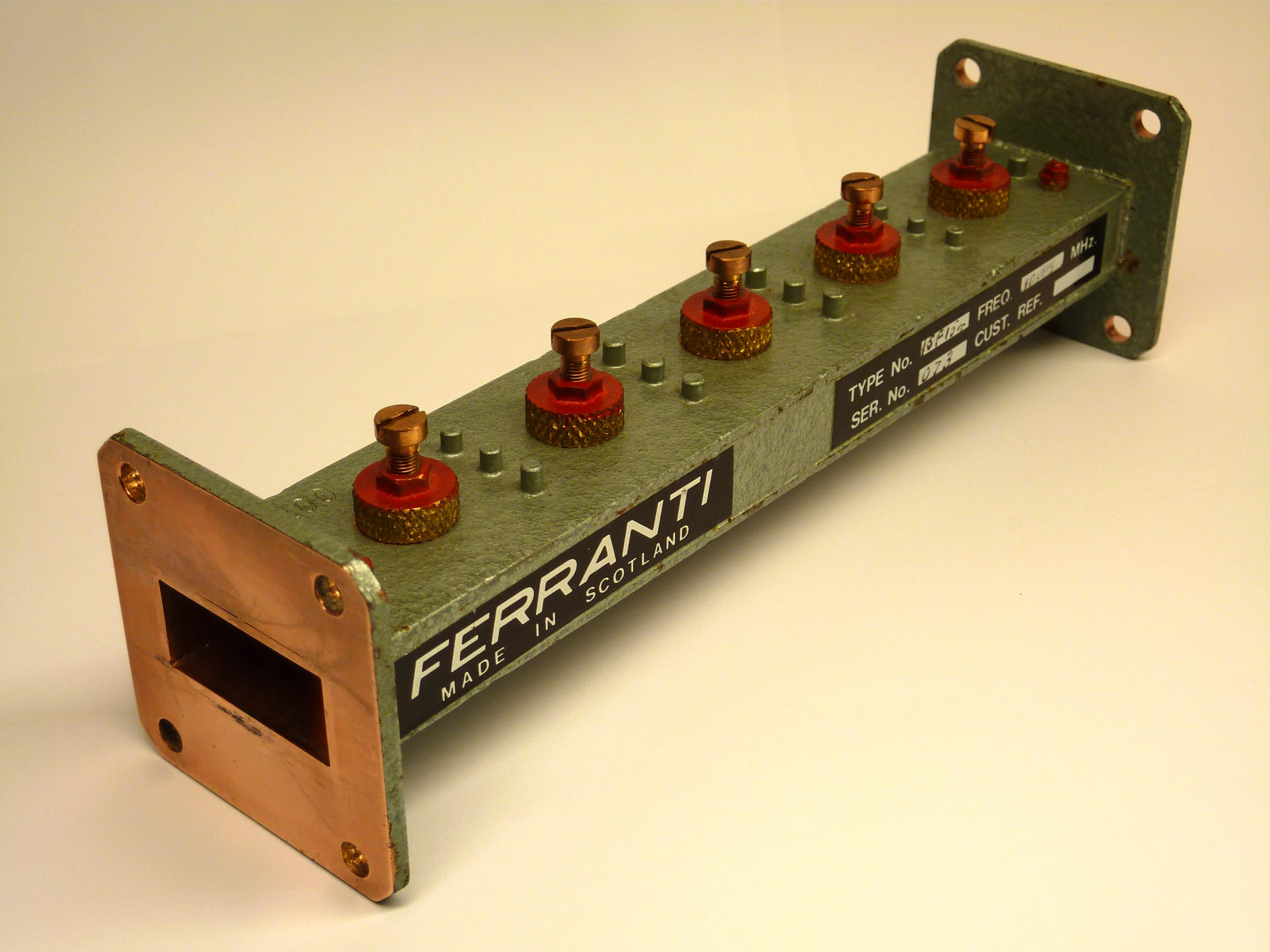
A waveguide filter

Many distributed-element designs can be directly implemented in waveguide. However, there is an additional complication with waveguides in that multiple modes are possible. These sometimes exist simultaneously, and this situation has no analogy in conducting lines. Waveguides have the advantages of lower loss and higher quality resonators over conducting lines, but their relative expense and bulk means that microstrip is often preferred. Waveguide mostly finds uses in high-end products, such as high-power military radars and the upper microwave bands (where planar formats are too lossy). Waveguide becomes bulkier with lower frequency, which militates against its use on the lower bands.

=== Mechanical ===
In a few specialist applications, such as the mechanical filters in high-end radio transmitters (marine, military, amateur radio), electronic circuits can be implemented as mechanical components; this is done largely because of the high quality of the mechanical resonators. They are used in the radio frequency band (below microwave frequencies), where waveguides might otherwise be used. Mechanical circuits can also be implemented, in whole or in part, as distributed-element circuits. The frequency at which the transition to distributed-element design becomes feasible (or necessary) is much lower with mechanical circuits. This is because the speed at which signals travel through mechanical media is much lower than the speed of electrical signals.

== Circuit components ==
There are several structures that are repeatedly used in distributed-element circuits. Some of the common ones are described below.

=== Stub ===
A stub is a short length of line that branches to the side of a main line. The end of the stub is often left open- or short-circuited, but may also be terminated with a lumped component. A stub can be used on its own (for instance, for impedance matching), or several of them can be used together in a more complex circuit such as a filter. A stub can be designed as the equivalent of a lumped capacitor, inductor, or resonator.

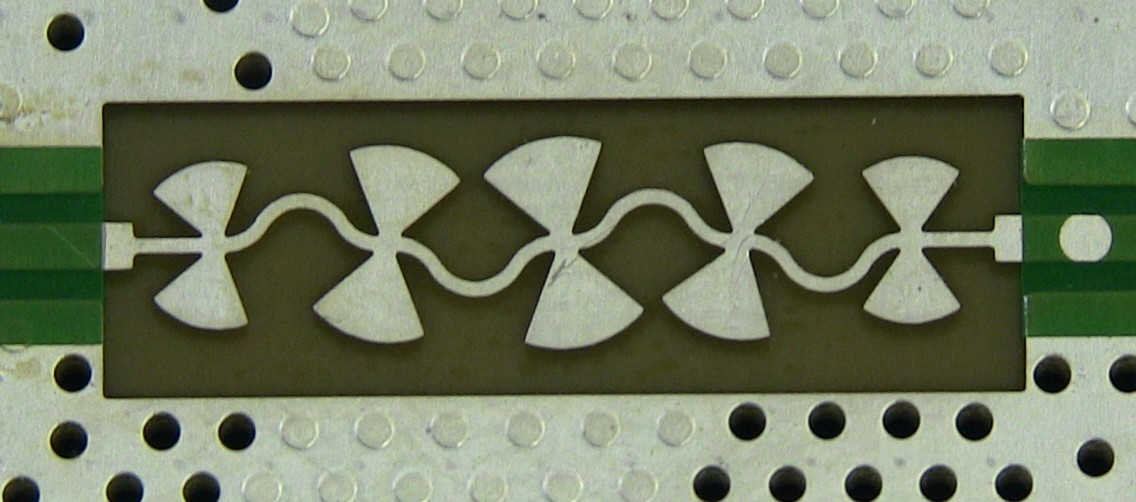
Butterfly stub filter

Departures from constructing with uniform transmission lines in distributed-element circuits are rare. One such departure that is widely used is the radial stub, which is shaped like a sector of a circle. They are often used in pairs, one on either side of the main transmission line. Such pairs are called butterfly or bowtie stubs.

=== Coupled lines ===
Coupled lines are two transmission lines between which there is some electromagnetic coupling. The coupling can be direct or indirect. In indirect coupling, the two lines are run closely together for a distance with no screening between them. The strength of the coupling depends on the distance between the lines and the cross-section presented to the other line. In direct coupling, branch lines directly connect the two main lines together at intervals.

Coupled lines are a common method of constructing power dividers and directional couplers. Another property of coupled lines is that they act as a pair of coupled resonators. This property is used in many distributed-element filters.

=== Cascaded lines ===
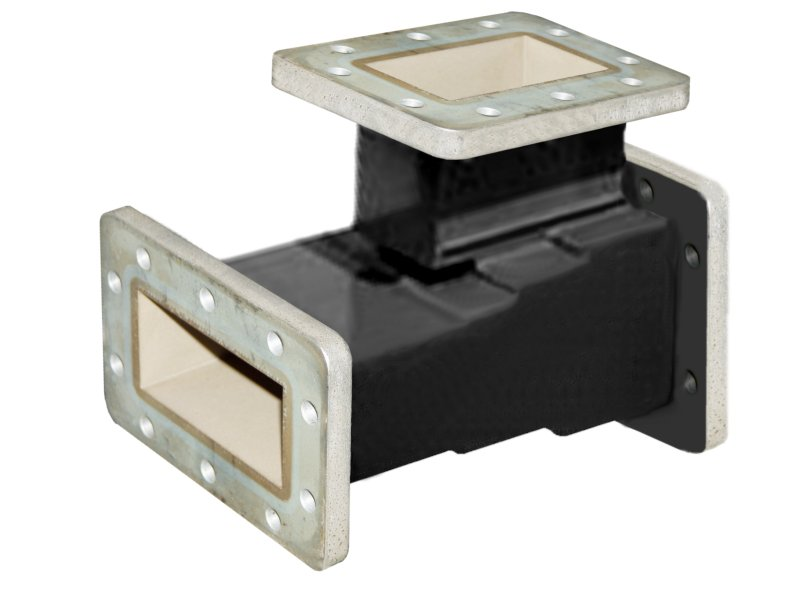
An orthomode transducer (a variety of duplexer) with stepped impedance matching

Cascaded lines are lengths of transmission line where the output of one line is connected to the input of the next. Multiple cascaded lines of different characteristic impedances can be used to construct a filter or a wide-band impedance matching network. This is called a stepped impedance structure. A single, cascaded line one-quarter wavelength long forms a quarter-wave impedance transformer. This has the useful property of transforming any impedance network into its dual; in this role, it is called an impedance inverter. This structure can be used in filters to implement a lumped-element prototype in ladder topology as a distributed-element circuit. The quarter-wave transformers are alternated with a distributed-element resonator to achieve this. However, this is now a dated design; more compact inverters, such as the impedance step, are used instead. An impedance step is the discontinuity formed at the junction of two cascaded transmission lines with different characteristic impedances.

=== Cavity resonator ===
A cavity resonator is an empty (or sometimes dielectric-filled) space surrounded by conducting walls. Apertures in the walls couple the resonator to the rest of the circuit. Resonance occurs due to electromagnetic waves reflected back and forth from the cavity walls setting up standing waves. Cavity resonators can be used in many media, but are most naturally formed in waveguide from the already existing metal walls of the guide.

=== Dielectric resonator ===
A dielectric resonator is a piece of dielectric material exposed to electromagnetic waves. It is most often in the form of a cylinder or thick disc. Although cavity resonators can be filled with dielectric, the essential difference is that in cavity resonators the electromagnetic field is entirely contained within the cavity walls. A dielectric resonator has some field in the surrounding space. This can lead to undesirable coupling with other components. The major advantage of dielectric resonators is that they are considerably smaller than the equivalent air-filled cavity.

=== Helical resonator ===
A helical resonator is a helix of wire in a cavity; one end is unconnected, and the other is bonded to the cavity wall. Although they are superficially similar to lumped inductors, helical resonators are distributed-element components and are used in the VHF and lower UHF bands.

=== Fractals ===
Three-iteration Hilbert fractal resonator in microstrip

The use of fractal-like curves as a circuit component is an emerging field in distributed-element circuits. Fractals have been used to make resonators for filters and antennae. One of the benefits of using fractals is their space-filling property, making them smaller than other designs. Other advantages include the ability to produce wide-band and multi-band designs, good in-band performance, and good out-of-band rejection. In practice, a true fractal cannot be made because at each fractal iteration the manufacturing tolerances become tighter and are eventually greater than the construction method can achieve. However, after a small number of iterations, the performance is close to that of a true fractal. These may be called pre-fractals or finite-order fractals where it is necessary to distinguish from a true fractal.

Fractals that have been used as a circuit component include the Koch snowflake, Minkowski island, Sierpiński curve, Hilbert curve, and Peano curve. The first three are closed curves, suitable for patch antennae. The latter two are open curves with terminations on opposite sides of the fractal. This makes them suitable for use where a connection in cascade is required.

=== Taper ===
A taper is a transmission line with a gradual change in cross-section. It can be considered the limiting case of the stepped impedance structure with an infinite number of steps. Tapers are a simple way of joining two transmission lines of different characteristic impedances. Using tapers greatly reduces the mismatch effects that a direct join would cause. If the change in cross-section is not too great, no other matching circuitry may be needed. Tapers can provide transitions between lines in different media, especially different forms of planar media. Tapers commonly change shape linearly, but a variety of other profiles may be used. The profile that achieves a specified match in the shortest length is known as a Klopfenstein taper and is based on the Chebychev filter design.

Tapers can be used to match a transmission line to an antenna. In some designs, such as the horn antenna and Vivaldi antenna, the taper is itself the antenna. Horn antennae, like other tapers, are often linear, but the best match is obtained with an exponential curve. The Vivaldi antenna is a flat (slot) version of the exponential taper.

=== Distributed resistance ===
Resistive elements are generally not useful in a distributed-element circuit. However, distributed resistors may be used in attenuators and line terminations. In planar media they can be implemented as a meandering line of high-resistance material, or as a deposited patch of thin-film or thick-film material. In waveguide, a card of microwave absorbent material can be inserted into the waveguide.

== Circuit blocks ==
=== Filters and impedance matching ===
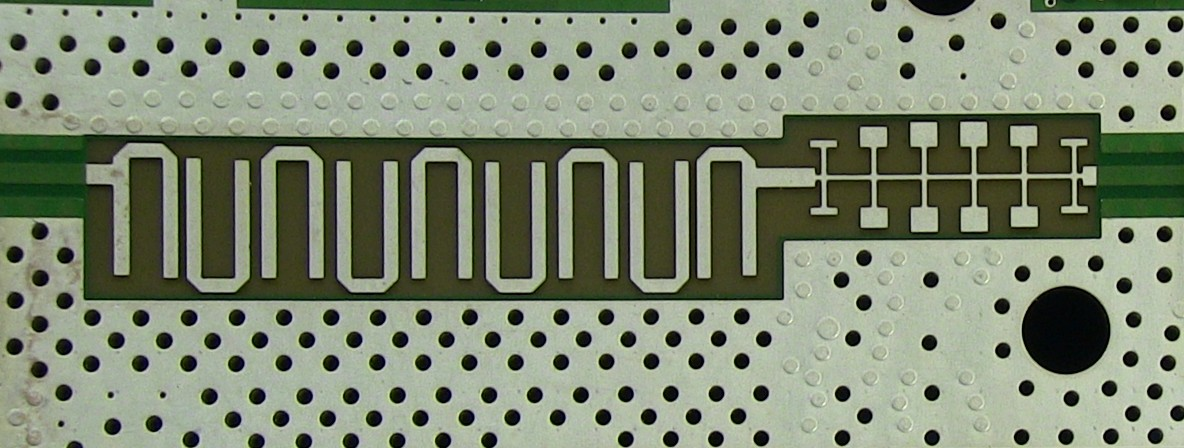
Microstrip band-pass hairpin filter (left), followed by a low-pass stub filter

Filters are a large percentage of circuits constructed with distributed elements. A wide range of structures are used for constructing them, including stubs, coupled lines and cascaded lines. Variations include interdigital filters, combline filters and hairpin filters. More-recent developments include fractal filters. Many filters are constructed in conjunction with dielectric resonators.

As with lumped-element filters, the more elements used, the closer the filter comes to an ideal response; the structure can become quite complex. For simple, narrow-band requirements, a single resonator may suffice (such as a stub or spurline filter).

Impedance matching for narrow-band applications is frequently achieved with a single matching stub. However, for wide-band applications the impedance-matching network assumes a filter-like design. The designer prescribes a required frequency response, and designs a filter with that response. The only difference from a standard filter design is that the filter's source and load impedances differ.

=== Power dividers, combiners and directional couplers ===
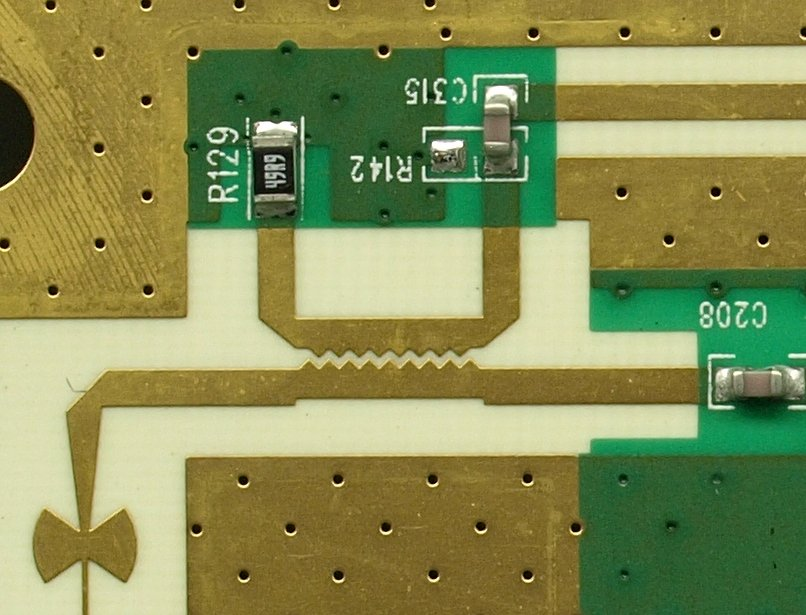
Microstrip sawtooth directional coupler, a variant of the coupled-lines directional coupler

A directional coupler is a four-port device which couples power flowing in one direction from one path to another. Two of the ports are the input and output ports of the main line. A portion of the power entering the input port is coupled to a third port, known as the coupled port. None of the power entering the input port is coupled to the fourth port, usually known as the isolated port. For power flowing in the reverse direction and entering the output port, a reciprocal situation occurs; some power is coupled to the isolated port, but none is coupled to the coupled port.

A power divider is often constructed as a directional coupler, with the isolated port permanently terminated in a matched load (making it effectively a three-port device). There is no essential difference between the two devices. The term directional coupler is usually used when the coupling factor (the proportion of power reaching the coupled port) is low, and power divider when the coupling factor is high. A power combiner is simply a power splitter used in reverse. In distributed-element implementations using coupled lines, indirectly coupled lines are more suitable for low-coupling directional couplers; directly coupled branch line couplers are more suitable for high-coupling power dividers.

Distributed-element designs rely on an element length of one-quarter wavelength (or some other length); this will hold true at only one frequency. Simple designs, therefore, have a limited bandwidth over which they will work successfully. Like impedance matching networks, a wide-band design requires multiple sections and the design begins to resemble a filter.

==== Hybrids ====
Hybrid ring, used to produce sum and difference signals

A directional coupler which splits power equally between the output and coupled ports (a 3 dB coupler) is called a hybrid. Although "hybrid" originally referred to a hybrid transformer (a lumped device used in telephones), it now has a broader meaning. A widely used distributed-element hybrid which does not use coupled lines is the hybrid ring or rat-race coupler. Each of its four ports is connected to a ring of transmission line at a different point. Waves travel in opposite directions around the ring, setting up standing waves. At some points on the ring, destructive interference results in a null; no power will leave a port set at that point. At other points, constructive interference maximises the power transferred.

Another use for a hybrid coupler is to produce the sum and difference of two signals. In the illustration, two input signals are fed into the ports marked 1 and 2. The sum of the two signals appears at the port marked Σ, and the difference at the port marked Δ. In addition to their uses as couplers and power dividers, directional couplers can be used in balanced mixers, frequency discriminators, attenuators, phase shifters, and antenna array feed networks.

=== Circulators ===
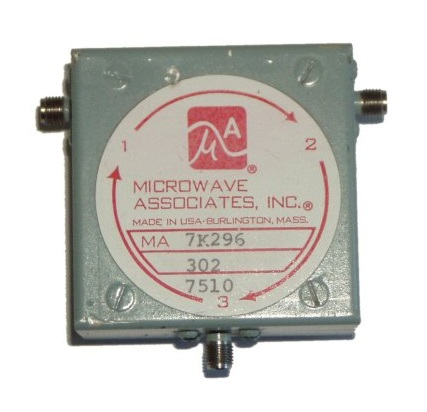
A coaxial ferrite circulator operating at 1 GHz

A circulator is usually a three- or four-port device in which power entering one port is transferred to the next port in rotation, as if round a circle. Power can flow in only one direction around the circle (clockwise or anticlockwise), and no power is transferred to any of the other ports. Most distributed-element circulators are based on ferrite materials. Uses of circulators include as an isolator to protect a transmitter (or other equipment) from damage due to reflections from the antenna, and as a duplexer connecting the antenna, transmitter and receiver of a radio system.

An unusual application of a circulator is in a reflection amplifier, where the negative resistance of a Gunn diode is used to reflect back more power than it received. The circulator is used to direct the input and output power flows to separate ports.

Passive circuits, both lumped and distributed, are nearly always reciprocal; however, circulators are an exception. There are several equivalent ways to define or represent reciprocity. A convenient one for circuits at microwave frequencies (where distributed-element circuits are used) is in terms of their S-parameters. A reciprocal circuit will have an S-parameter matrix, [S], which is symmetric. From the definition of a circulator, it is clear that this will not be the case,

$$[S] = \begin{pmatrix}
0 & 0 & 1\\
1 & 0 & 0 \\
0 & 1 & 0
\end{pmatrix}$$

for an ideal three-port circulator, showing that circulators are non-reciprocal by definition. It follows that it is impossible to build a circulator from standard passive components (lumped or distributed). The presence of a ferrite, or some other non-reciprocal material or system, is essential for the device to work.

== Active components ==
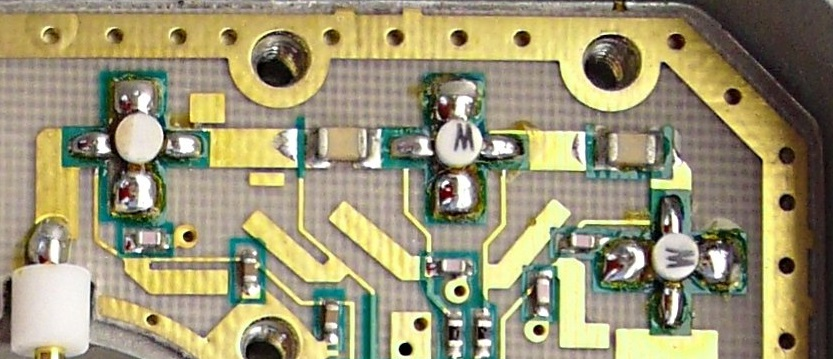
Microstrip circuit with discrete transistors in miniature surface-mount packages, capacitors and resistors in chip form, and biasing filters as distributed elements

Distributed elements are usually passive, but most applications will require active components in some role. A microwave hybrid integrated circuit uses distributed elements for many passive components, but active components (such as diodes, transistors, and some passive components) are discrete. The active components may be packaged, or they may be placed on the substrate in chip form without individual packaging to reduce size and eliminate packaging-induced parasitics.

Distributed amplifiers consist of a number of amplifying devices (usually FETs), with all their inputs connected via one transmission line and all their outputs via another transmission line. The lengths of the two lines must be equal between each transistor for the circuit to work correctly, and each transistor adds to the output of the amplifier. This is different from a conventional multistage amplifier, where the gain is multiplied by the gain of each stage. Although a distributed amplifier has lower gain than a conventional amplifier with the same number of transistors, it has significantly greater bandwidth. In a conventional amplifier, the bandwidth is reduced by each additional stage; in a distributed amplifier, the overall bandwidth is the same as the bandwidth of a single stage. Distributed amplifiers are used when a single large transistor (or a complex, multi-transistor amplifier) would be too large to treat as a lumped component; the linking transmission lines separate the individual transistors.

== History ==
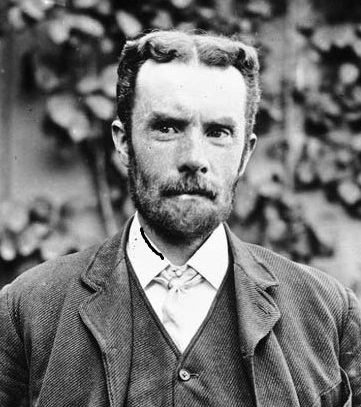
Oliver Heaviside

Distributed-element modelling was first used in electrical network analysis by Oliver Heaviside in 1881. Heaviside used it to find a correct description of the behaviour of signals on the transatlantic telegraph cable. Transmission of early transatlantic telegraph had been difficult and slow due to dispersion, an effect which was not well understood at the time. Heaviside's analysis, now known as the telegrapher's equations, identified the problem and suggested methods for overcoming it. It remains the standard analysis of transmission lines.

Warren P. Mason was the first to investigate the possibility of distributed-element circuits, and filed a patent in 1927 for a coaxial filter designed by this method. Mason and Sykes published the definitive paper on the method in 1937. Mason was also the first to suggest a distributed-element acoustic filter in his 1927 doctoral thesis, and a distributed-element mechanical filter in a patent filed in 1941. Mason's work was concerned with the coaxial form and other conducting wires, although much of it could also be adapted for waveguide. The acoustic work had come first, and Mason's colleagues in the Bell Labs radio department asked him to assist with coaxial and waveguide filters.

Before World War II, there was little demand for distributed-element circuits; the frequencies used for radio transmissions were lower than the point at which distributed elements became advantageous. Lower frequencies had a greater range, a primary consideration for broadcast purposes. These frequencies require long antennae for efficient operation, and this led to work on higher-frequency systems. A key breakthrough was the 1940 introduction of the cavity magnetron which operated in the microwave band and resulted in radar equipment small enough to install in aircraft. A surge in distributed-element filter development followed, filters being an essential component of radars. The signal loss in coaxial components led to the first widespread use of waveguide, extending the filter technology from the coaxial domain into the waveguide domain.

The wartime work was mostly unpublished until after the war for security reasons, which made it difficult to ascertain who was responsible for each development. An important centre for this research was the MIT Radiation Laboratory (Rad Lab), but work was also done elsewhere in the US and Britain. The Rad Lab work was published by Fano and Lawson. Another wartime development was the hybrid ring. This work was carried out at Bell Labs, and was published after the war by W. A. Tyrrell. Tyrrell describes hybrid rings implemented in waveguide, and analyses them in terms of the well-known waveguide magic tee. Other researchers soon published coaxial versions of this device.

George Matthaei led a research group at Stanford Research Institute which included Leo Young and was responsible for many filter designs. Matthaei first described the interdigital filter and the combline filter. The group's work was published in a landmark 1964 book covering the state of distributed-element circuit design at that time, which remained a major reference work for many years.

Planar formats began to be used with the invention of stripline by Robert M. Barrett. Although stripline was another wartime invention, its details were not published until 1951. Microstrip, invented in 1952, became a commercial rival of stripline; however, planar formats did not start to become widely used in microwave applications until better dielectric materials became available for the substrates in the 1960s. Another structure which had to wait for better materials was the dielectric resonator. Its advantages (compact size and high quality) were first pointed out by R. D. Richtmeyer in 1939, but materials with good temperature stability were not developed until the 1970s. Dielectric resonator filters are now common in waveguide and transmission line filters.

Important theoretical developments included Paul I. Richards' commensurate line theory, which was published in 1948, and Kuroda's identities, a set of transforms which overcame some practical limitations of Richards theory, published by Kuroda in 1955. According to Nathan Cohen, the log-periodic antenna, invented by Raymond DuHamel and Dwight Isbell in 1957, should be considered the first fractal antenna. However, its self-similar nature, and hence its relation to fractals was missed at the time. It is still not usually classed as a fractal antenna. Cohen was the first to explicitly identify the class of fractal antennae after being inspired by a lecture of Benoit Mandelbrot in 1987, but he could not get a paper published until 1995.

== Bibliography ==
- Ahn, Hee-Ran, Asymmetric Passive Components in Microwave Integrated Circuits, John Wiley & Sons, 2006 ISBN 0470036958.
- Albanese, V J; Peyser, W P, "An Analysis of a Broad-Band Coaxial Hybrid Ring", IRE Transactions on Microwave Theory and Techniques, vol. 6, iss. 4, pp. 369–373, October 1958.
- Awang, Zaiki, Microwave Systems Design, Springer Science & Business Media, 2013 ISBN 981445124X.
- Bahl, Inder J, Fundamentals of RF and Microwave Transistor Amplifiers, John Wiley & Sons, 2009 ISBN 0470462310.
- Bahl, Inder J, Control Components Using Si, GaAs, and GaN Technologies, Artech House, 2014 ISBN 1608077128.
- Bakshi, U A; Bakshi, A V, Antenna And Wave Propagation, Technical Publications, 2009 ISBN 8184317220.
- Banerjee, Amal, Automated Electronic Filter Design, Springer, 2016 ISBN 3319434705.
- Barrett, R M, "Etched Sheets Serve as Microwave Components", Electronics, vol. 25, pp. 114–118, June 1952.
- Barrett, R M; Barnes, M H, "Microwave Printed Circuits", Radio TV News, vol. 46, 16 September 1951.
- Bhat, Bharathi; Koul, Shiban K, Stripline-like Transmission Lines for Microwave Integrated Circuits, New Age International, 1989 ISBN 8122400523.
- Borden, Brett, Radar Imaging of Airborne Targets, CRC Press, 1999 ISBN 1420069004.
- Brittain, James E, "The Introduction of the Loading Coil: George A. Campbell and Michael I. Pupin", Technology and Culture, vol. 11, no. 1, pp. 36–57, January 1970.
- Chang, Kai; Hsieh, Lung-Hwa, Microwave Ring Circuits and Related Structures, John Wiley & Sons, 2004 ISBN 047144474X.
- Chen, L F; Ong, C K; Neo, C P; Varadan, V V; Varadan, Vijay K, Microwave Electronics: Measurement and Materials Characterization, John Wiley & Sons, 2004 ISBN 0470020458.
- Cohen, Nathan, "Fractal Antenna and Fractal Resonator Primer", ch. 8 in, Frame, Michael, Benoit Mandelbrot: A Life In Many Dimensions, World Scientific, 2015 ISBN 9814366064.
- Craig, Edwin C, Electronics via Waveform Analysis, Springer, 2012 ISBN 1461243386.
- Doumanis, Efstratios; Goussetis, George; Kosmopoulos, Savvas, Filter Design for Satellite Communications: Helical Resonator Technology, Artech House, 2015 ISBN 160807756X.
- DuHamell, R; Isbell, D, "Broadband Logarithmically Periodic Antenna Structures", 1958 IRE International Convention Record, New York, 1957, pp. 119–128.
- Edwards, Terry C; Steer, Michael B, Foundations of Microstrip Circuit Design, John Wiley & Sons, 2016 ISBN 1118936191.
- Fagen, M D; Millman, S, A History of Engineering and Science in the Bell System: Volume 5: Communications Sciences (1925–1980), AT&T Bell Laboratories, 1984 ISBN 0932764061.
- Fano, R M; Lawson, A W, "Design of Microwave Filters", ch. 10 in, Ragan, G L (ed), Microwave Transmission Circuits, McGraw-Hill, 1948 OCLC 2205252.
- Garg, Ramesh; Bahl, Inder; Bozzi, Maurizio, Microstrip Lines and Slotlines, Artech House, 2013 ISBN 1608075354.
- Ghione, Giovanni; Pirola, Marco, Microwave Electronics, Cambridge University Press, 2017 ISBN 1107170273.
- Grieg, D D; Englemann, H F, "Microstrip – A New Transmission Technique for the Kilomegacycle Range", Proceedings of the IRE, vol. 40, iss. 12, pp. 1644–1650, December 1952.
- Gupta, S K, Electro Magnetic Field Theory, Krishna Prakashan Media, 2010 ISBN 8187224754.
- Harrel, Bobby, The Cable Television Technical Handbook, Artech House, 1985 ISBN 0890061572.
- Heaviside, Oliver, Electrical Papers, vol. 1, pp. 139–140, Copley Publishers, 1925 OCLC 3388033.
- Heaviside, Oliver, "Electromagnetic Induction and its Propagation", The Electrician, pp. 79–81, 3 June 1887 OCLC 6884353.
- Helszajn, J, Ridge Waveguides and Passive Microwave Components, IET, 2000 ISBN 0852967942.
- Henderson, Bert; Camargo, Edmar, Microwave Mixer Technology and Applications, Artech House, 2013 ISBN 1608074897.
- Hilty, Kurt, "Attenuation Measurement", pp. 422–439 in, Dyer, Stephen A (ed), Wiley Survey of Instrumentation and Measurement, John Wiley & Sons, 2004 ISBN 0471221651.
- Hong, Jia-Shen G; Lancaster, M J, Microstrip Filters for RF/Microwave Applications, John Wiley & Sons, 2004 ISBN 0471464201.
- Hunter, Ian, Theory and Design of Microwave Filters, IET, 2001 ISBN 0852967772.
- Hura, Gurdeep S; Singhal, Mukesh, Data and Computer Communications: Networking and Internetworking, CRC Press, 2001 ISBN 1420041312.
- Ishii, T Koryu, Handbook of Microwave Technology: Components and devices, Academic Press, 1995 ISBN 0123746965.
- Janković, Nikolina; Zemlyakov, Kiril; Geschke, Riana Helena; Vendik, Irina; Crnojević-Bengin, Vesna, "Fractal-based Multi-band Microstrip Filters", ch. 6 in, Crnojević-Bengin, Vesna (ed), Advances in Multi-Band Microstrip Filters, Cambridge University Press, 2015 ISBN 1107081971.
- Johnson, Robert A, Mechanical Filters in Electronics, John Wiley & Sons Australia, 1983 ISBN 0471089192.
- Johnson, Robert A; Börner, Manfred; Konno, Masashi, "Mechanical Filters – A Review of Progress", IEEE Transactions on Sonics and Ultrasonics, vol. 18, iss. 3, pp. 155–170, July 1971.
- Kumar, Narendra; Grebennikov, Andrei, Distributed Power Amplifiers for RF and Microwave Communications, Artech House, 2015 ISBN 1608078329.
- Lacomme, Philippe; Marchais, Jean-Claude; Hardange, Jean-Philippe; Normant, Eric, Air and Spaceborne Radar Systems, William Andrew, 2001 ISBN 0815516134.
- Lee, Thomas H, Planar Microwave Engineering, Cambridge University Press, 2004 ISBN 0521835267.
- Levy, R; Cohn, S B, "A History of Microwave Filter Research, Design, and Development", IEEE Transactions: Microwave Theory and Techniques, pp. 1055–1067, vol. 32, iss. 9, 1984.
- Linkhart, Douglas K, Microwave Circulator Design, Artech House, 2014 ISBN 1608075834.
- Magnusson, Philip C; Weisshaar, Andreas; Tripathi, Vijai K; Alexander, Gerald C, Transmission Lines and Wave Propagation, CRC Press, 2000 ISBN 0849302692.
- Makimoto, M; Yamashita, S, Microwave Resonators and Filters for Wireless Communication, Springer, 2013 ISBN 3662043254.
- Maloratsky, Leo G, Passive RF and Microwave Integrated Circuits, Elsevier, 2004 ISBN 0080492053.
- Maloratsky, Leo G, Integrated Microwave Front-ends with Avionics Applications, Artech House, 2012 ISBN 1608072061.
- Mason, Warren P, "Wave filter", U.S. patent 2,345,491, filed 25 June 1927, issued 11 November 1930.
- Mason, Warren P, "Wave transmission network", U.S. patent 2,345,491, filed 25 November 1941, issued 28 March 1944.
- Mason, Warren P, "Electromechanical wave filter", U.S. patent 2,981,905, filed 20 August 1958, issued 25 April 1961.
- Mason, W P; Sykes, R A, "The Use of Coaxial and Balanced Transmission Lines in Filters and Wide-Band Transformers for High Radio Frequencies", Bell System Technical Journal, vol. 16, pp. 275–302, 1937.
- Matthaei, G L, "Interdigital Band-Pass Filters", IRE Transactions on Microwave Theory and Techniques, vol. 10, iss. 6, pp. 479–491, November 1962.
- Matthaei, G L, "Comb-Line Band-Pass Filters of Narrow or Moderate Bandwidth", Microwave Journal, vol. 6, pp. 82–91, August 1963 ISSN 0026-2897.
- Matthaei, George L; Young, Leo; Jones, E M T, Microwave Filters, Impedance-Matching Networks, and Coupling Structures McGraw-Hill 1964 OCLC 830829462.
- Meikle, Hamish, Modern Radar Systems, Artech House, 2008 ISBN 1596932430.
- Milligan, Thomas A, Modern Antenna Design, John Wiley & Sons, 2005 ISBN 0471720607.
- Misra, Devendra K, Radio-Frequency and Microwave Communication Circuits, John Wiley & Sons, 2004 ISBN 0471478733.
- Natarajan, Dhanasekharan, A Practical Design of Lumped, Semi-lumped & Microwave Cavity Filters, Springer Science & Business Media, 2012 ISBN 364232861X.
- Nguyen, Cam, Radio-Frequency Integrated-Circuit Engineering, John Wiley & Sons, 2015 ISBN 0471398209.
- Ozaki, H; Ishii, J, "Synthesis of a Class of Strip-Line Filters", IRE Transactions on Circuit Theory, vol. 5, iss. 2, pp. 104–109, June 1958.
- Penn, Stuart; Alford, Neil, "Ceramic Dielectrics for Microwave Applications", ch. 10 in, Nalwa, Hari Singh (ed), Handbook of Low and High Dielectric Constant Materials and Their Applications, Academic Press, 1999 ISBN 0080533531.
- Polkinghorn, Frank A, "Oral-History: Warren P. Mason", interview no. 005 for the IEEE History Centre, 3 March 1973, Engineering and Technology History Wiki, retrieved 15 April 2018.
- Ramadan, Ali; Al-Husseini, Mohammed; Kabalan Karim Y; El-Hajj, Ali, "Fractal-Shaped Reconfigurable Antennas", ch. 10 in, Nasimuddin, Nasimuddin, Microstrip Antennas, IntechOpen, 2011 ISBN 9533072474.
- Richards, Paul I, "Resistor-Transmission-Line Circuits", Proceedings of the IRE, vol. 36, iss. 2, pp. 217–220, 1948.
- Richtmeyer, R D, "Dielectric Resonators", Journal of Applied Physics, vol. 10, iss. 6, pp. 391–397, June 1939.
- Roer, T G, Microwave Electronic Devices, Springer, 2012 ISBN 1461525004.
- Sharma, K K, Fundamental of Microwave and Radar Engineering, S. Chand Publishing, 2011 ISBN 8121935377.
- Sheingold, L S; Morita, T, "A Coaxial Magic-T", Transactions of the IRE Professional Group on Microwave Theory and Techniques, vol. 1, iss. 2, pp. 17–23, November 1953.
- Sisodia, M L; Raghuvanshi, G S, Basic Microwave Techniques and Laboratory Manual, New Age International, 1987 ISBN 0852268580.
- Taylor, John; Huang, Qiuting, CRC Handbook of Electrical Filters, CRC Press, 1997 ISBN 0849389518.
- Tyrrell, W A, "Hybrid Circuits for Microwaves", Proceedings of the IRE, vol. 35, iss. 11, pp. 1294–1306, November 1947.
- Vendelin, George D; Pavio, Anthony M; Rohde, Ulrich L, Microwave Circuit Design Using Linear and Nonlinear Techniques, John Wiley & Sons, 2005 ISBN 0471715824.
- Whitaker, Jerry C, The Resource Handbook of Electronics, CRC Press, 2000 ISBN 1420036866.
- Zhurbenko, Vitaliy; Krozer, Viktor; Rubæk, Tonny, "Impedance Transformers", ch. 14 in Zhurbenko, Vitaliy (ed), Passive Microwave Components and Antennas, IntechOpen, 2010 ISBN 9533070838.
