= Inverted-F antenna =

Antenna used in wireless communication

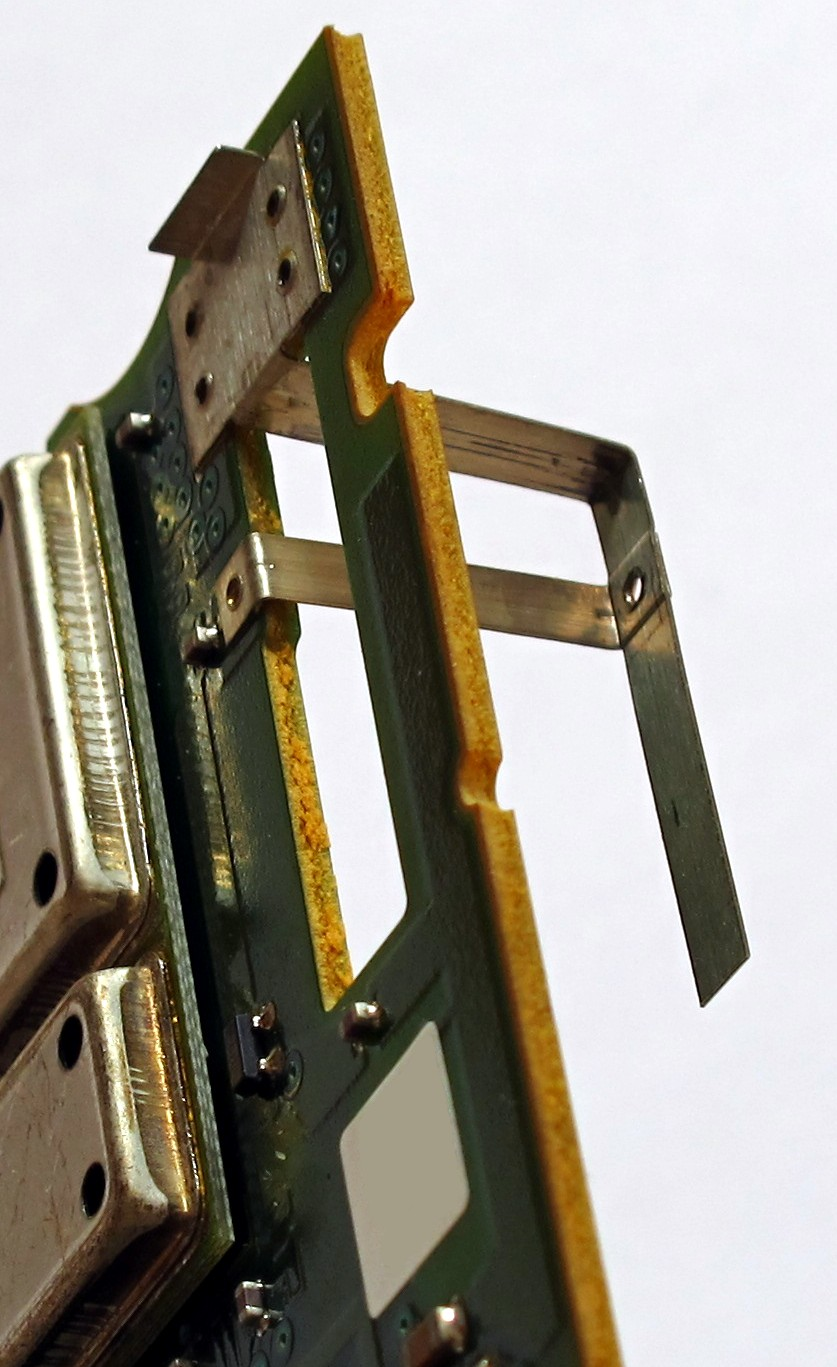
An inverted-F antenna in a DECT (a technology used for cordless phones and similar devices) base station

An inverted-F antenna is a type of antenna used in wireless communication, mainly at UHF and microwave frequencies. It consists of a monopole antenna running parallel to a ground plane and grounded at one end. The antenna is fed from an intermediate point a distance from the grounded end. The design has two advantages over a simple monopole: the antenna is shorter and more compact, allowing it to be contained within the case of the mobile device, and it can be impedance matched to the feed circuit by the designer, allowing it to radiate power efficiently, without the need for extraneous matching components.

The inverted-F antenna was first conceived in the 1950s as a bent-wire antenna. However, its most widespread use is as a planar inverted-F antenna (PIFA) in mobile wireless devices for its space saving properties. PIFAs can be printed using the microstrip format, a widely used technology that allows printed RF components to be manufactured as part of the same printed circuit board used to mount other components.

PIFAs are a variant of the patch antenna. Many variants of this, and other forms of the inverted-F, exist that implement wideband or multi-band antennas. Techniques include coupled resonators and the addition of slots.

== Evolution and history ==
A quarter-wave monopole, B intermediate-fed quarter-wave monopole, C inverted-L antenna, D inverted-F antenna

The inverted-F antenna is an evolution of the widely used quarter-wave monopole antenna, which consists of a conductive rod mounted perpendicularly above a conductive ground plane, fed at its base. The wire F-type antenna was invented in the 1940s. In this antenna the feed is connected to an intermediate point along the length of the antenna instead of to the base, and the base of the antenna is connected to the ground plane. The advantage of doing this is that the input impedance of the antenna is dependent on the distance of the feed point from the grounded end. The portion of the antenna between the feedpoint and the ground plane is essentially behaving as a short-circuit stub. Thus, the designer can match the antenna to the feedline impedance by setting the position of the feed point along the antenna element.

The inverted-L antenna is a monopole antenna bent over to run parallel to the ground plane. It has the advantage of compactness and a shorter length than the $\tfrac{1}{4}\lambda$ monopole, but the disadvantage of a very low impedance, typically just a few ohms if fed at the base, while a base fed $\tfrac{1}{4}\lambda$ monopole has an impedance of 36.5 Ω . The inverted-F antenna combines the advantages of both these antennas; it has the compactness of the inverted-L, and the ability to match the impedance of the feed circuit (often 50 Ω on a printed circuit) like the F-type.

The inverted-F antenna was first proposed in 1958 by the group at Harvard led by Ronold W. P. King. King's antenna was in wire form and was intended for use in missiles for telemetry.

== Planar implementation ==
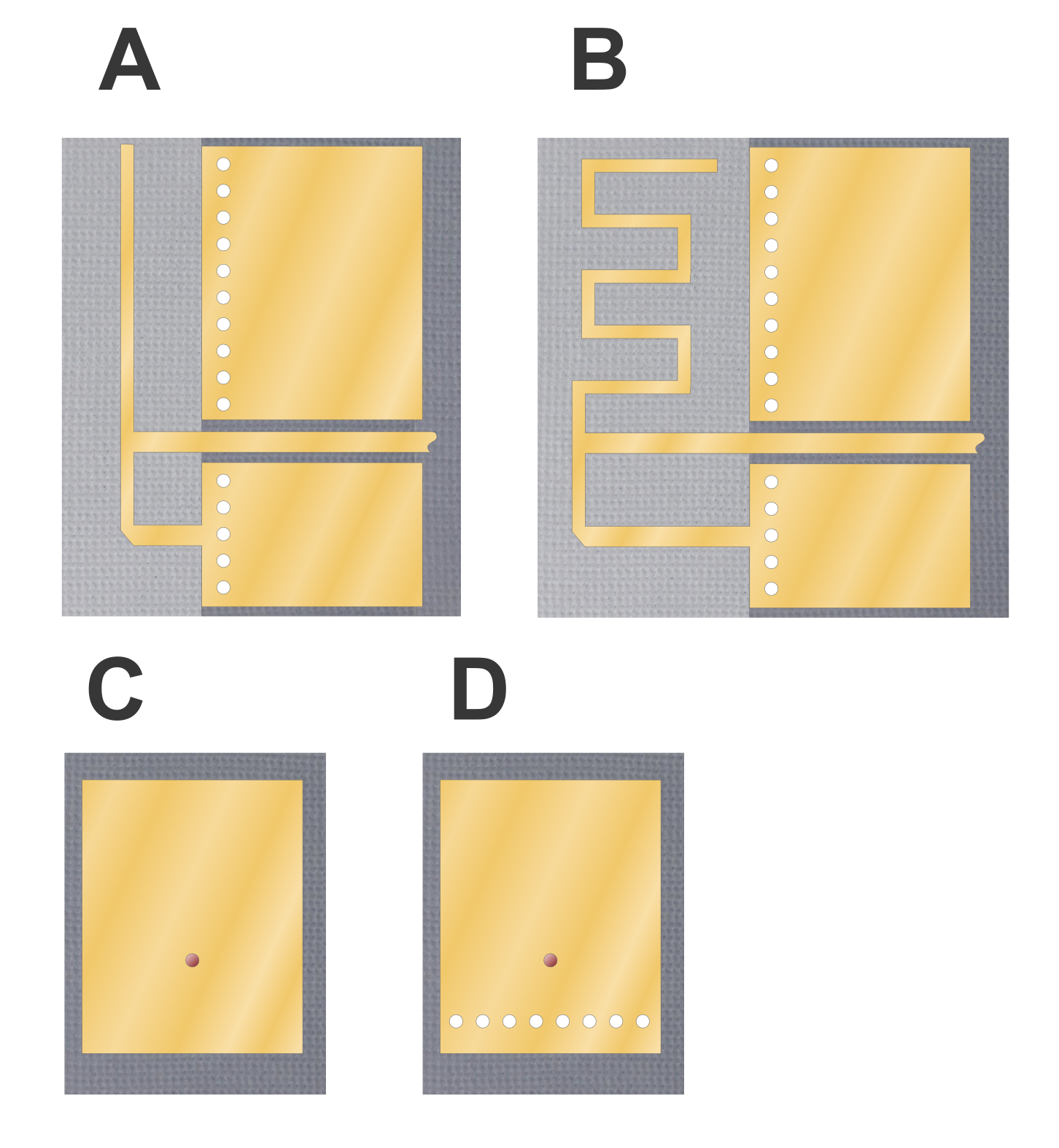
A: printed inverted-F antenna, B: meandered printed inverted-F antenna: C: patch antenna: D: Planar inverted-F antenna (PIFA): Board without ground plane / Board with ground plane; Antenna feed pin / Ground pin

A planar inverted-F antenna (PIFA) is used for wireless circuitry implemented in microstrip. The microstrip format is the format of choice for modern RF electronics. It can be used to implement required distributed-element RF components such as filters, while at the same time being economical because the same mass production methods are used as for printed circuit boards.

A printed inverted-F antenna can be implemented in the classic inverted-F shape, usually to one side of the circuit board where the ground plane has been removed from underneath the antenna. However, another approach is a modified patch antenna, the shorted patch antenna. In this approach, one edge of the patch, or some intermediate point, is grounded with grounding pins or vias through to the ground plane. This works on the same principle as an inverted-F; viewed sideways, the F shape can be seen, it is just that the antenna element is very wide in the horizontal plane. The shorted patch antenna has a wider bandwidth than the thin line type due to the greater radiation area. Like the thin line type, the shorted patch antenna can be printed on the same printed circuit board as the rest of the circuitry. However, they are commonly printed on to their own board, or on to a dielectric fixed to the main board. This is done so that the antenna, which can be suspended and effectively be in air dielectric, is a greater distance from the ground plane than it would otherwise be, or the dielectric used is a more suitable material for RF performance.

The term PIFA is reserved by many authors (e.g. Sánchez-Hernández) for the shorted patch antenna where the antenna element is wide with the ground plane underneath. The thin line type of inverted-F antennas with the ground plane to one side like A and B in the diagram are just called IFA even if they are in planar format. An author may even call an IFA of this type a printed inverted-F antenna but still reserve PIFA for the shorted patch type (e.g. Hall and Wang.)

A common configuration for a shorted patch antenna is to place the shorting pin as close to one corner as possible with the feed pin relatively close to the shorting pin. In this configuration, the resonant frequency is given approximately by,

$$f_0 = \frac {c} {4 (w + b) \sqrt \varepsilon_\mathrm r}$$
where
f_{0} is the resonant frequency
w, b are the width and breadth of the patch
c is the speed of light
ε_{r} is the dielectric constant of the substrate.

This formula only holds if the antenna is not affected by nearby dielectrics, such as the casing of the device.

Another variation that may be encountered is the meandered inverted-F antenna (MIFA). Where there is insufficient board space to extend an antenna to the full required length, the antenna may be meandered to reduce its height while retaining its designed electrical length. This can be compared to the spiralling of an antenna as found in the rubber ducky antenna.

Inverted-F antennas have narrow bandwidths. A wider bandwidth can be achieved by lengthening the antenna, which increases its radiation resistance. Another solution is to place two antennas in close proximity. This works because coupled resonators have a bandwidth wider than the bandwidth of either resonator on its own. Most of the techniques for producing multi-band antennas are also effective at broadening bandwidth.

== Multi-band antennas ==
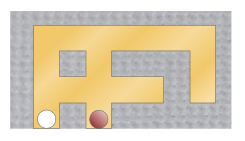
A dual-band printed inverted-F antenna from a PC Card application providing a network interface controller in the 2.4 GHz and 5.2 GHz bands

The need for multi-band antennas arises with mobile devices that need to roam between countries and networks where the frequency bands used can often be different. Perhaps the most conceptually simple design, first reported in 1997, is to nest two PIFA patch antennas one inside the other. Another technique is to insert one or more spur lines into the patch, which has the effect of coupled resonators broadening the band. Other techniques rely on multiple modes being generated, which makes for a more compact design. Examples of this are the C-slot pattern, which is a similar pattern to the interdigital filter, and the tightly meandered pattern shown as, respectively, C and D in the diagram.

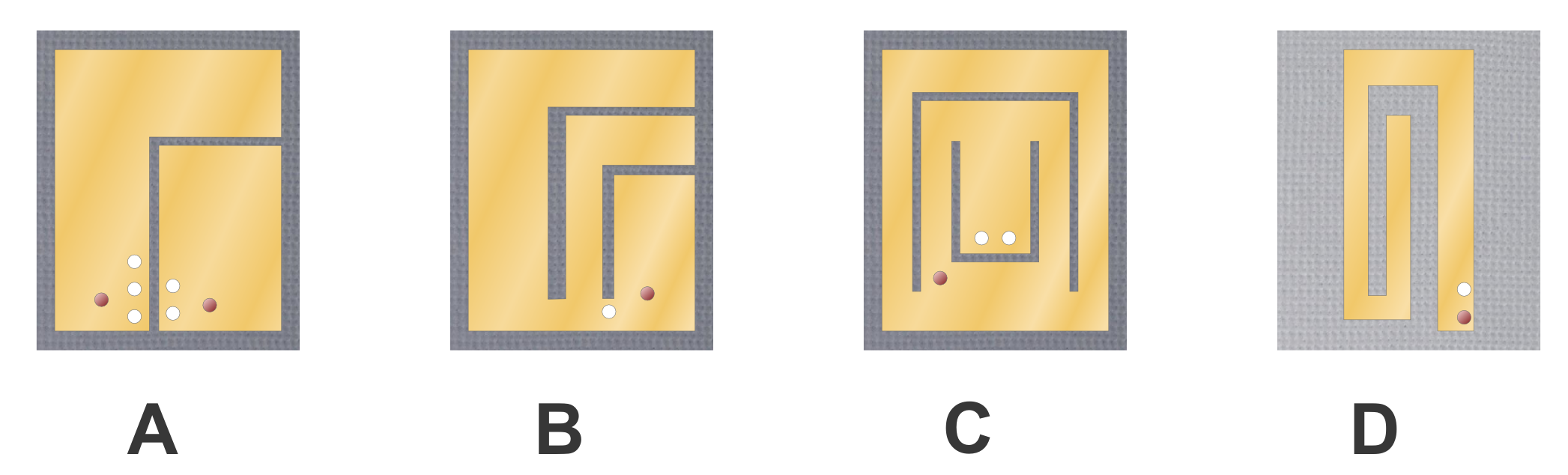
Multi-band PIFA designs, A: nested PIFA patch antennas, B: PIFA patch antenna with two spur lines producing a tri-band antenna, C: a similar tri-band antenna with C-slots, D: tightly meandered inverted-F

== Applications ==
Inverted-F antennas are widely used in compact hand-held wireless devices where space is at a premium. This includes mobile phones and tablet computers using wireless transmissions such as GSM, Bluetooth, and Wi-Fi. The planar inverted-F antenna is the most frequently used internal antenna in mobile phone designs.

These antennas are also of use for vehicle telematics. Vehicle manufacturers like to use antennas that follow the contours of the vehicle for style and aerodynamic reasons. Multiband PIFAs can be used to combine the antenna feeds for mobile phone, satellite navigation, and car radio.

These antennas have been used for telemetry applications at military test ranges, including those supporting Inter-Range Instrumentation Group standards.

An R-shaped dual-band PIFA has been proposed for use on military vehicles. The bands to be covered are 225 MHz and 450 MHz. These frequencies are in the same ratio as the mobile phone GSM bands at 900 MHz and 1.8 GHz so the design could be used for this application as well if the dimensions were scaled down to suit.

== Bibliography ==
- Ali, M.; Guangli Yang; Huan-Sheng Hwang; Sittironnarit, T., "Design and analysis of an R-shaped dual-band planar inverted-F antenna for vehicular applications", IEEE Transactions on Vehicular Technology, vol. 53, iss. 1, pp. 29–37, January 2004.
- Barton, "Nosecone Inverted-F (IFA) for S-Band Telemetry", DTIC, 2017
- Cohen, N., Fractal antenna applications in wireless telecommunications", Professional Program Proceedings: Electronics Forum of New England, 1997, pp. 43–49, 6–8 May 1997, IEEE ISBN 0780339878.
- Hall, Peter S.; Lee, E.; Song, C. T. P., "Planar inverted-F antennas", pp. 197–227, in Waterhouse, Rod (ed), Printed Antennas for Wireless Communications, John Wiley & Sons, 2008 ISBN 0470512253.
- Hall, Peter S.; Yang Hao, Antennas and Propagation for Body-Centric Wireless Communications, 2nd ed., Artech House, 2012 ISBN 1608073769.
- Kervel, Fredrik, 868 MHz, 915 MHz and 955 MHz inverted F Antenna, Texas Instruments, Design Note DN023 30 September 2011.
- Kin-Lu Wong, Yen-Yu Chen, Saou-Wen Su, Yen-Liang Kuo, "Diversity dual-band planar inverted-F antenna for WLAN operation", Microwave and Optical Technology Letters, vol. 38, iss. 3, pp. 223–225, 5 August 2003.
- King, Ronold W. P.; Harrison, C. W., Jr.; Denton, D. H., Jr., "Transmission-line missile antennas", Sandia Corp Technical Memo 436-58, vol. 14, November 1958.
- King, Ronold W. P.; Harrison, C. W., Jr.; Denton, D. H., Jr., "Transmission-line missile antennas", IRE Transactions on Antennas and Propagation, vol. 8, iss. 1, pp. 88–90, January 1960.
- Liu, Z. D.; Hall, P. S.; Wake, D., "Dual frequency planar inverted F antenna", IEEE Transactions on Antennas and Propagation, vol. 45, iss. 10, pp. 1451–1458, October 1997.
- Petosa, Aldo, Frequency-Agile Antennas for Wireless Communications, Artech House, 2013 ISBN 1608077691.
- Prasad, Shiela; King, Ronold W. P., "Experimental study of inverted L-, T-, and related transmission-line antennas", Journal of Research of the National Bureau of Standards, vol. 65, no. 5, pp. 449–454, September–October 1961.
- Sánchez-Hernández, David A., Multiband Integrated Antennas for 4G Terminals, Artech House, 2008 ISBN 1596933984.
- Waterhouse, Rod; Novak, Dalma, "Wireless systems and printed antennas", pp. 1–36, in Waterhouse, Rod (ed), Printed Antennas for Wireless Communications, John Wiley & Sons, 2008 ISBN 0470512253.
- Yarman, Binboga Siddik, Design of Ultra Wideband Antenna Matching Networks, Springer, 2008 ISBN 1402084188.
