= Patch antenna =

Type of antenna with a low profile

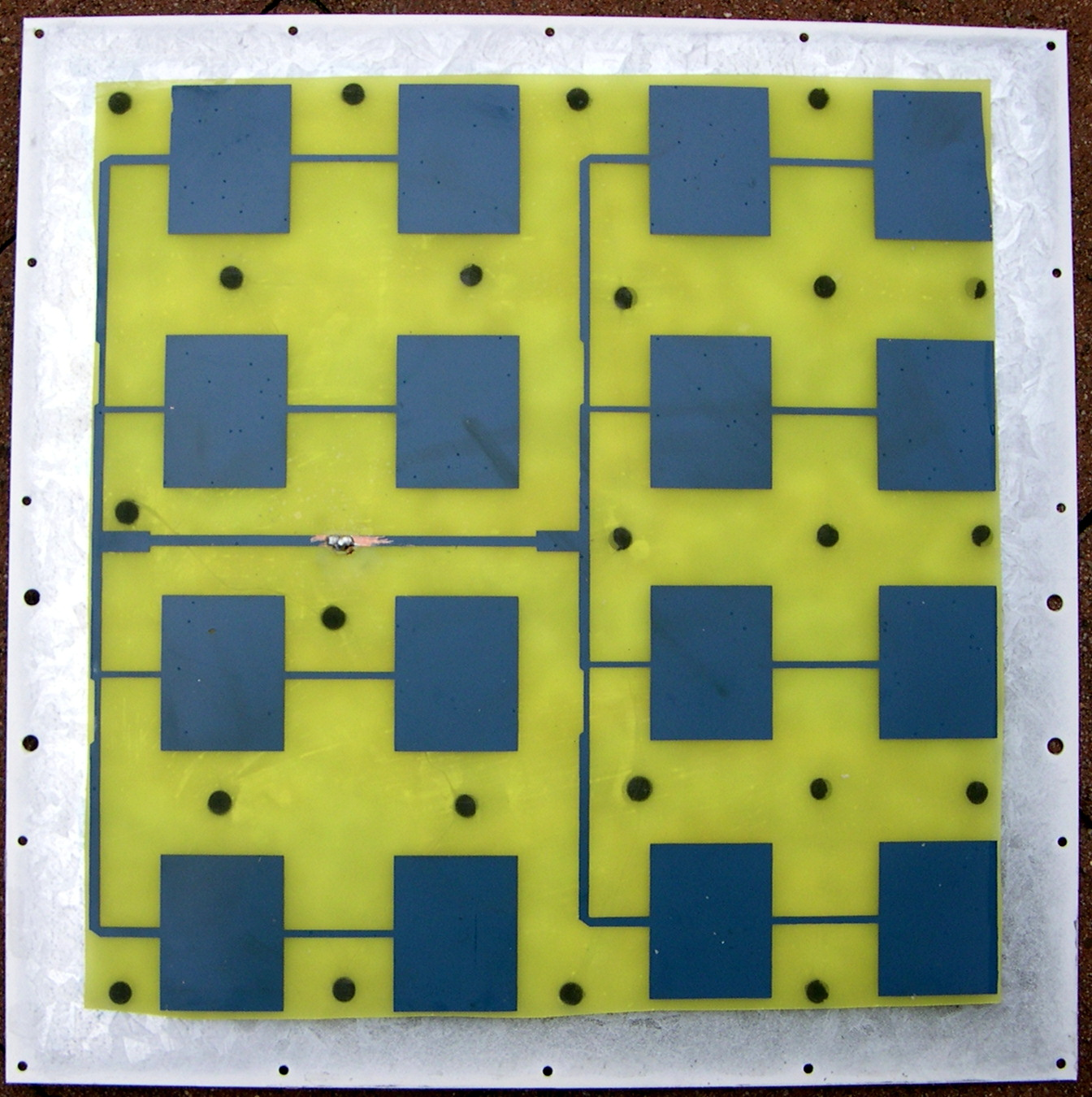
4×4 array of 2.4 GHz patch antenna elements

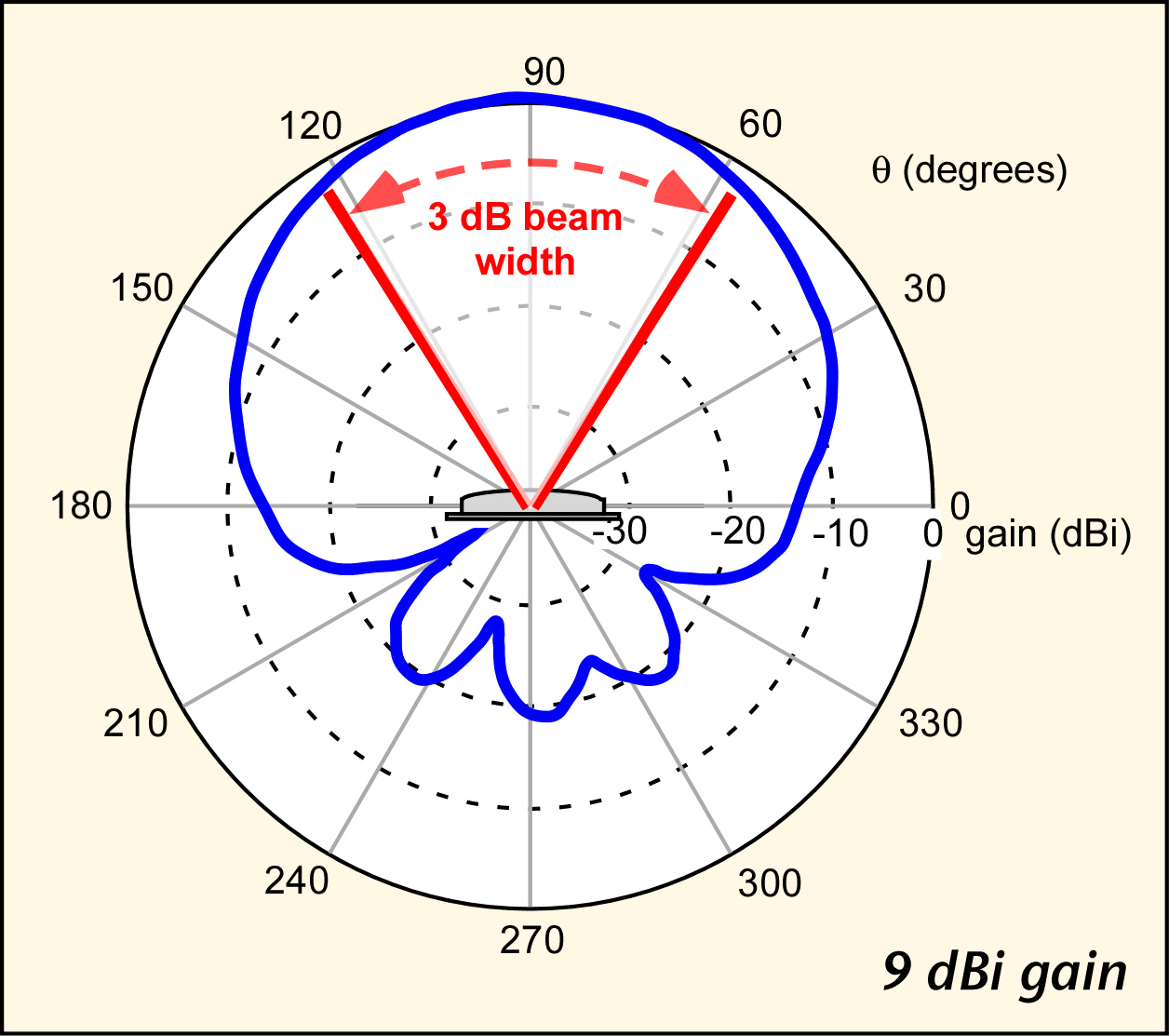
Patch antenna gain pattern

A patch antenna is a type of antenna with a low profile, usually consisting of a printed circuit board. It consists of a planar rectangular or circular sheet or "patch" of metal, mounted over a larger sheet of metal called a ground plane. It is the original type of microstrip antenna described by Howell in 1972.

The two metal sheets together form a resonant piece of microstrip transmission line with a length of approximately one-half wavelength of the radio waves. The radiation mechanism arises from fringing fields along the radiating edges. The radiation at the edges causes the antenna to act slightly larger electrically than its physical dimensions, so in order for the antenna to be resonant, a length of microstrip transmission line slightly shorter than one-half the wavelength at the frequency is used. The patch antenna is mainly practical at microwave frequencies, at which wavelengths are short enough that the patches are conveniently small. It is widely used in portable wireless devices because of the ease of fabricating it on printed circuit boards. Multiple patch antennas on the same substrate (see image) called microstrip antennas, can be used to make high gain array antennas, and phased arrays in which the beam can be electronically steered.

A variant of the patch antenna commonly used in mobile phones is the shorted patch antenna, or planar inverted-F antenna (PIFA). In this antenna, one corner of the patch (or sometimes one edge) connected to ground via a pin. This variant has better matching than the standard patch.

== See also ==
- Microwave Radiometer (Juno) (Space probe instrument, uses patch array antennas)
