= Slow wave =

Slow wave may refer to:

== Oscillations of low frequency ==
- Slow wave potential, a rhythmic electrophysiological event in the gastrointestinal tract
- Slow-wave sleep
- Slow-wave coupler, a set of coupled microstrip lines

== Other ==
- Slow Wave, a comic strip
