= Vivaldi antenna =

Type of broadband antenna

A Vivaldi antenna or Vivaldi aerial or tapered slot antenna is a co-planar broadband-antenna, which can be made from a solid piece of sheet metal, a printed circuit board, or from a dielectric plate metalized on one or both sides.

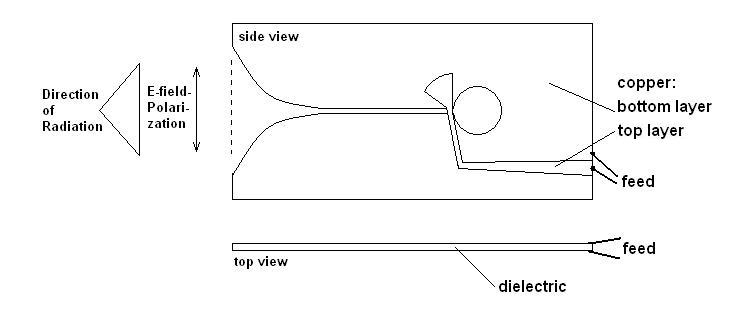
Patterned Vivaldi antenna, made from double-sided printed circuit board material

The feedline excites an open space via a microstrip line or coaxial cable, and may be terminated with either a sector-shaped area or a direct coaxial connection. From the open space, the signal traverses an exponentially tapered pattern via a symmetrical slot line.

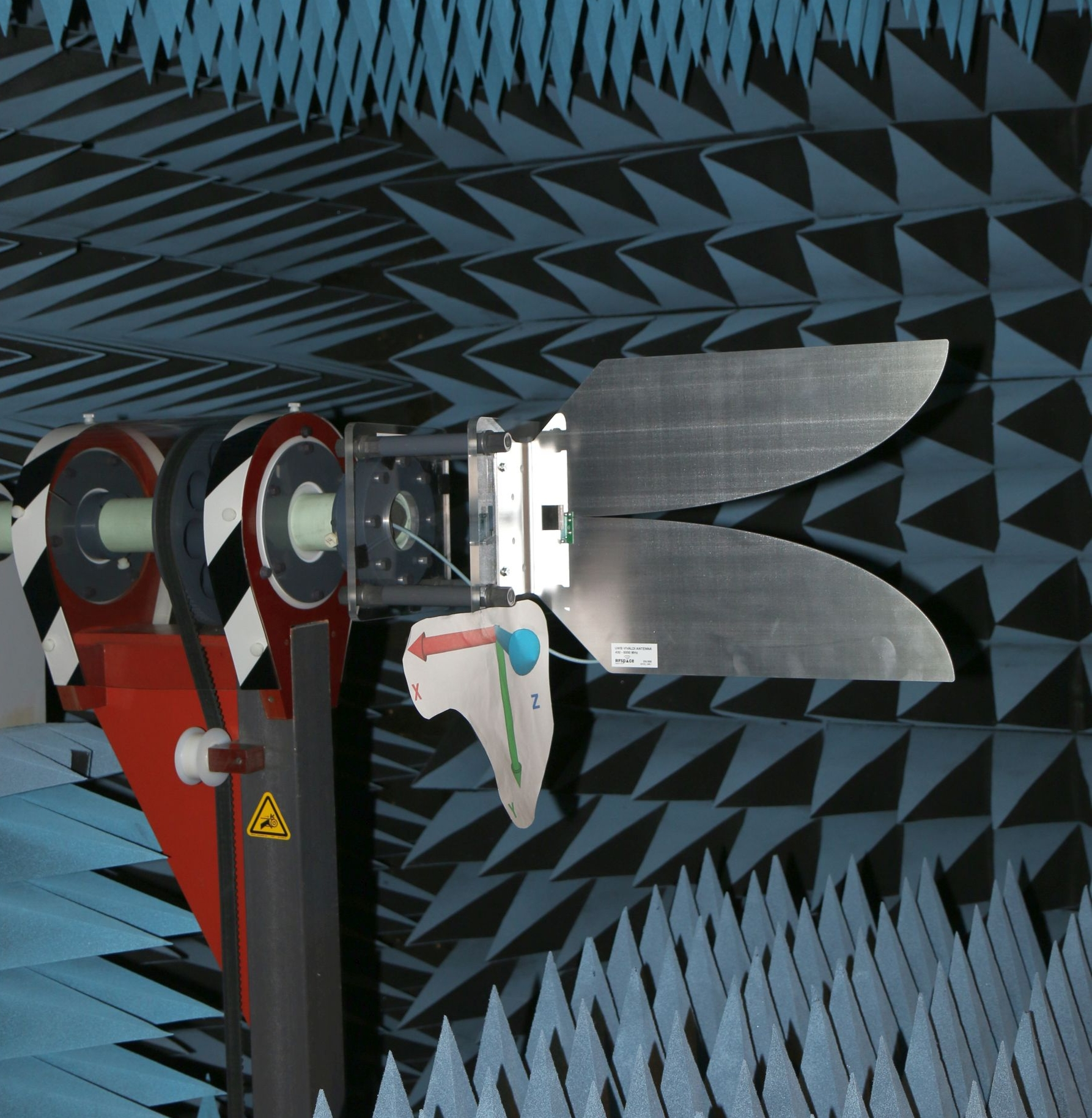
A single-piece sheet metal Vivaldi antenna being tested in an anechoic chamber

Vivaldi antennas can be made for linear polarized waves or – using two devices arranged in orthogonal direction – for transmitting / receiving both polarization orientations.

If fed with 90° phase-shifted signals, orthogonal devices can transmit/receive circular-oriented electromagnetic waves.

Vivaldi antennas are useful for any frequency, as all antennas are scalable in size for use at any wavelength. Printed circuit technology makes this type antenna cost effective for microwave frequencies 1 GHz or higher.

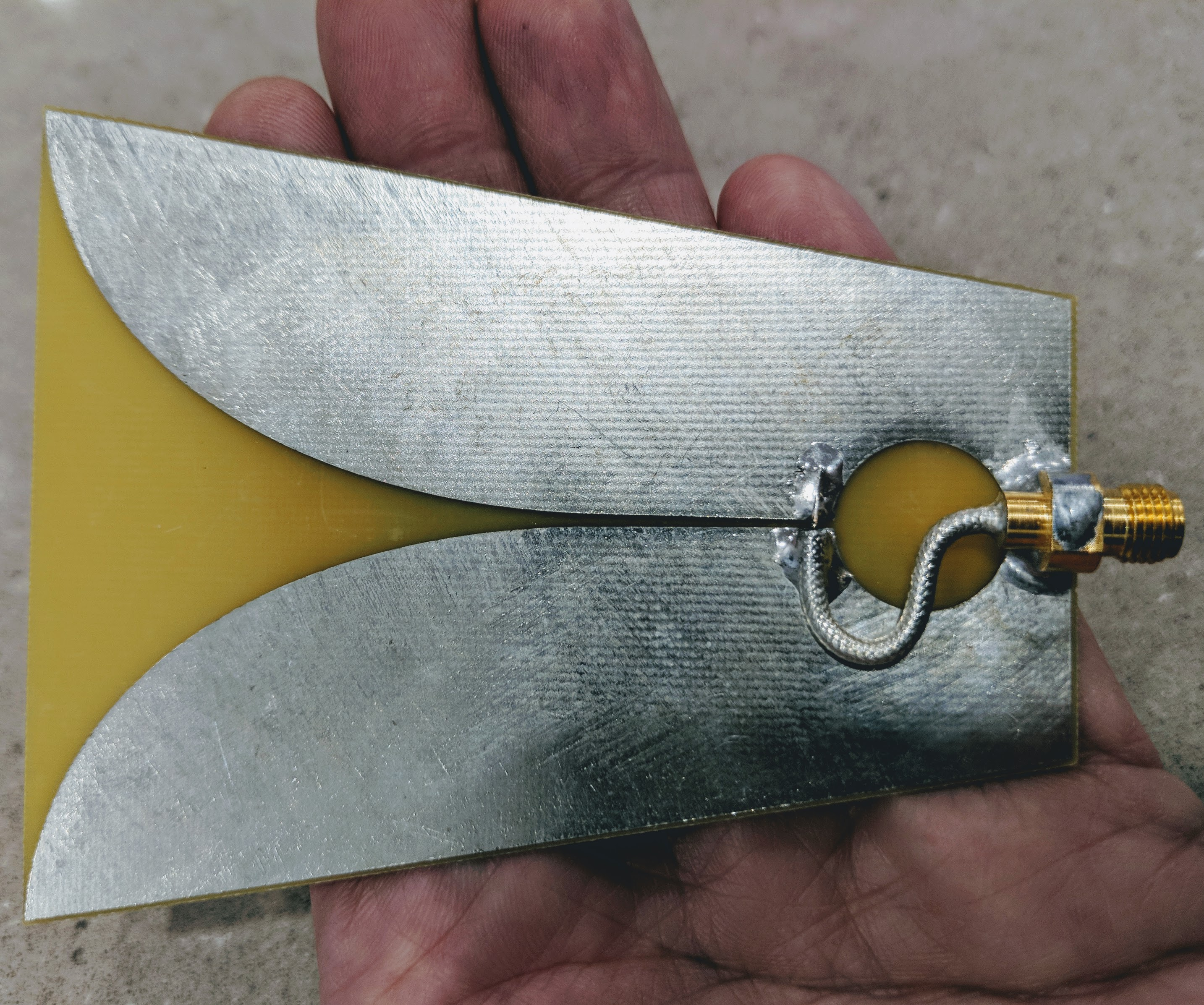
An inexpensive Vivaldi antenna is etched upon a printed circuit board and fed with a soldered-on coaxial cable and SMA connector.

Advantages of Vivaldi antennas are their broadband characteristics (suitable for ultra-wideband signals), their easy manufacturing process using common methods for PCB production, and their easy impedance matching to the feeding line using microstrip line modeling methods.

The MWEE collection of EM simulation benchmarks includes a Vivaldi antenna.

Several researchers have experimented variations in the shape of the Vivaldi antenna to improve some of its characteristics. An example is the Palm Tree Vivaldi Antenna, with greater gain and directivity, used in Near-Field Microwave Biomedical Imaging Applications.
