= Dwight Isbell =

American inventor

Dwight Ellston Isbell
- Born: 23 May 1929; Seattle, Washington
- Died: 19 August 2011
- Citizenship: United States
- Education: University of Illinois
- Known for: Co-inventor of the Log-periodic antenna
- Scientific career
- Workplaces: University of Illinois and Boeing
- Academic advisors: Raymond DuHamel

Dwight Isbell was a radio engineer, IEEE antennas and propagation fellow, and co-inventor of the Log-periodic antenna while a student at the University of Illinois under Raymond DuHamel. The log periodic antenna made possible broadband reception of color television signals. He is notable for the invention of antenna, and the resulting lawsuits regarding the antenna.

The invention of the antenna and the patents were widely ignored by Channel Master and Blonder-Tongue, and resulted in the precedent setting Blonder-Tongue doctrine of "judicial economy", which bars defendants of patents from that have been previously ruled invalid (changing the Triplett v. Lowe precedent).
