= Spurline =

Printed-circuit layout acting as a bandstop filter

The spurline is a type of radio-frequency and microwave distributed element filter with band-stop (notch) characteristics, most commonly used with microstrip transmission lines. Spurlines usually exhibit moderate to narrow-band rejection, at about 10% around the central frequency.

Spurline filters are very convenient for dense integrated circuits because of their inherently compact design and ease of integration: they occupy surface that corresponds only to a quarter-wavelength transmission line.

== Structure description ==
It consists of a normal microstrip line breaking into a pair of smaller coupled lines that rejoin after a quarter-wavelength distance. Only one of the input ports of the coupled lines is connected to the feed microstrip, as shown in the figure below. The orange area of the illustration is the microstrip transmission line conductor and the gray color the exposed dielectric.

Figure : Microstrip Spurline Notch Filter (Top View)

Where $\lambda_g$ is the wavelength corresponding to the central rejection frequency of the bandstop filter, measured - of course - in the microstrip line material. This is the most important parameter of the filter that sets the rejection band.

The distance between the two coupled lines can be selected appropriately to fine-tune the filter. The smaller the distance, the narrower the stop-band in terms of rejection. Of course that is limited by the circuit-board printing resolution, and it is usually considered at about 10% of the input microstrip width.

The gap between the input microstrip line and the one open-circuited line of the coupler has a negligible effect on the frequency response of the filter. Therefore, it is considered approximately equal to the distance of the two coupled lines.

== Printed antennae ==
Spurlines can also be used in printed antennae such as the planar inverted-F antenna. The additional resonances can be designed to widen the antenna bandwidth or to create multiple bands, for instance, for a tri-band mobile phone.

== History ==
A spurline filter was first proposed by Schiffman and Matthaei in stripline form in 1964. Bates adapted the design for microstrip in 1977. Nguyen and Hsieh improved the analysis for microstrip implementations in 1983.
