= Dalma Novak =

Australian electrical engineer

Dalma Novak is an Australian electrical engineer known for her expertise in radio over fiber. Formerly a professor at the University of Melbourne and president of the IEEE Photonics Society, she works in Maryland in the US as vice president of engineering at Octane Wireless.

== Education and career ==
Novak studied electrical engineering at the University of Queensland, where she earned a bachelor's degree with first class honors in 1987, and a PhD in 1992.

She became a faculty member in the University of Melbourne Department of Electrical and Electronic Engineering in 1992, and was named professor and chair of telecommunications in 2004. In the same year she co-founded Pharad LLC, while continuing at the University of Melbourne until 2009 as a professorial fellow and subsequently as an honorary professor. Pharad LLC since became Octane Wireless, where Novak is vice president of engineering.

She was president of the IEEE Photonics Society for 2014–2015.

== Recognition ==
Novak was named as an IEEE Fellow in 2007 "for contributions to enabling technologies for the implementation of fiber radio systems". She was the 2018 winner of the Engineering Achievement Award of the IEEE Photonics Society, "for the creation and development of breakthrough technologies for the microwave photonics field, in particular for fiber-radio communication systems".
