= Slow-wave coupler =

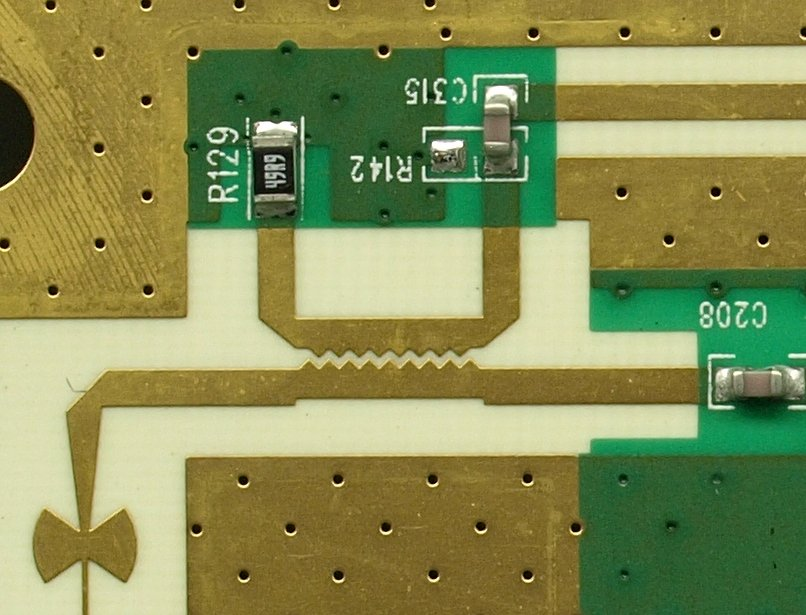
Microstrip sawtooth directional coupler

A slow-wave coupler is a directional coupler consisting of microstrip lines in which there is a corrugation in the inner edges of the transmission lines where the coupling takes place. The objective is to reduce the phase velocity of the odd mode of the coupled lines to match that of the even mode, and thereby to improve the isolation and directivity of the coupler.
