= Vladimir Ovchinnikov (graffiti artist) =

Russian painter, ethnographer and social activist (1938–2026)

- Владимир Овчинников
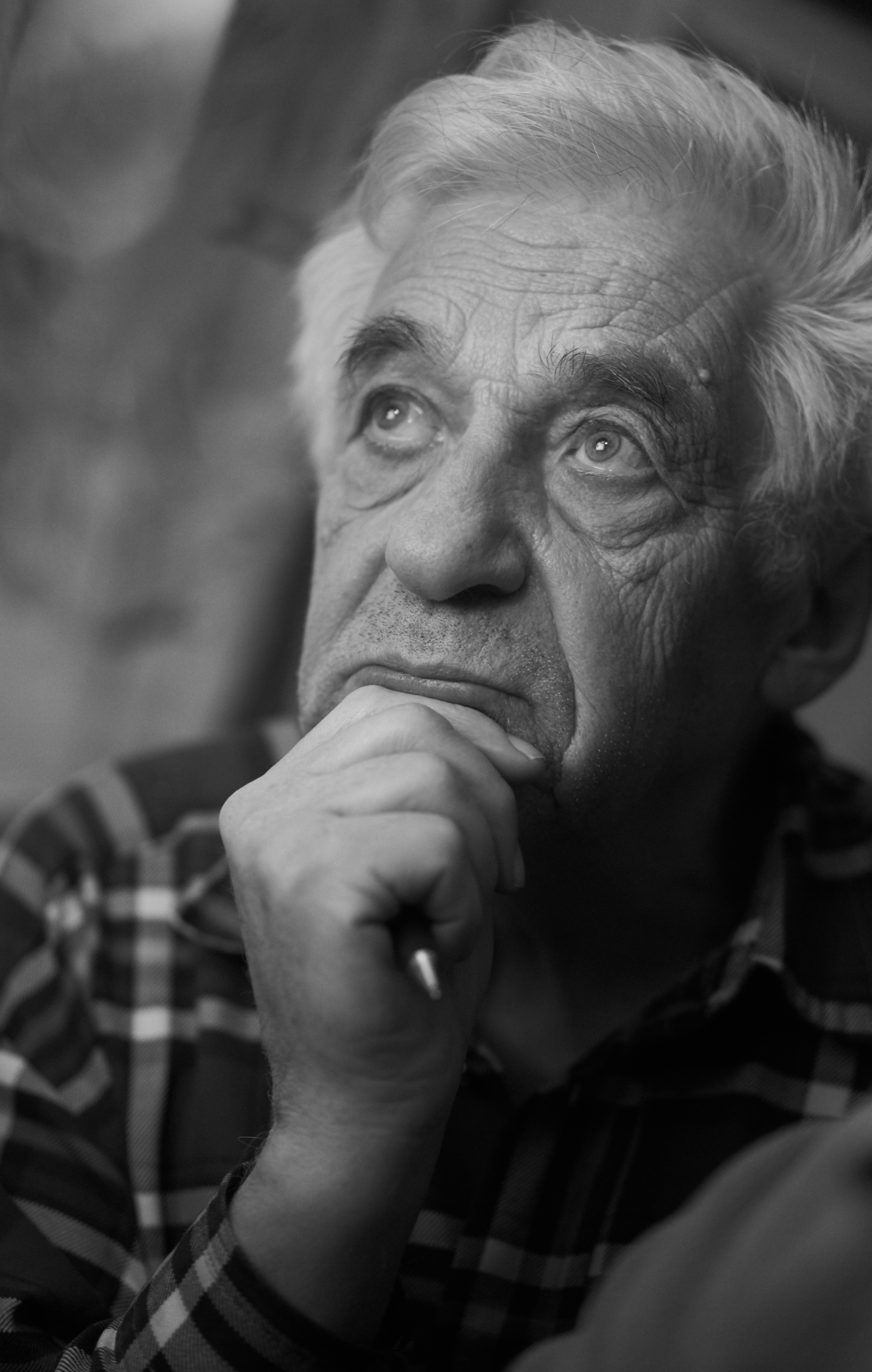
- Ovchinnikov in 2016
- Born: 17 February 1938; Dushanbe, Tajik SSR, USSR
- Died: 13 May 2026 (aged 88); Borovsk, Kaluga Oblast, Russia
- Occupations: Painter, ethnographer, social activist
- Known for: Painting, graffiti

Vladimir Aleksandrovich Ovchinnikov (Russian: Владимир Александрович Овчинников; 17 February 1938 – 13 May 2026) was a Russian painter, ethnographer and social activist, who was the founder of the wall painting movement in the city of Borovsk.

== Life and career ==
Vladimir Ovchinnikov was born in 1938 in Dushanbe. Graduated from Moscow State University of Civil Engineering, he worked on construction sites and was also engaged in scientific work as an academic candidate in Economic Sciences. Until 1998 he lived in Moscow, and then, after retirement, settled in the city of Borovsk, Kaluga Oblast. He started drawing during his school days, when there was enough free time for it. But only in the last period, after having settled in Borovsk, he was able to devote himself entirely to painting. In 2000 he had a solo exhibition at the Art Gallery of Borovsk. There he presented about 100 works – landscapes, portraits, and still lifes, all made with pastels.

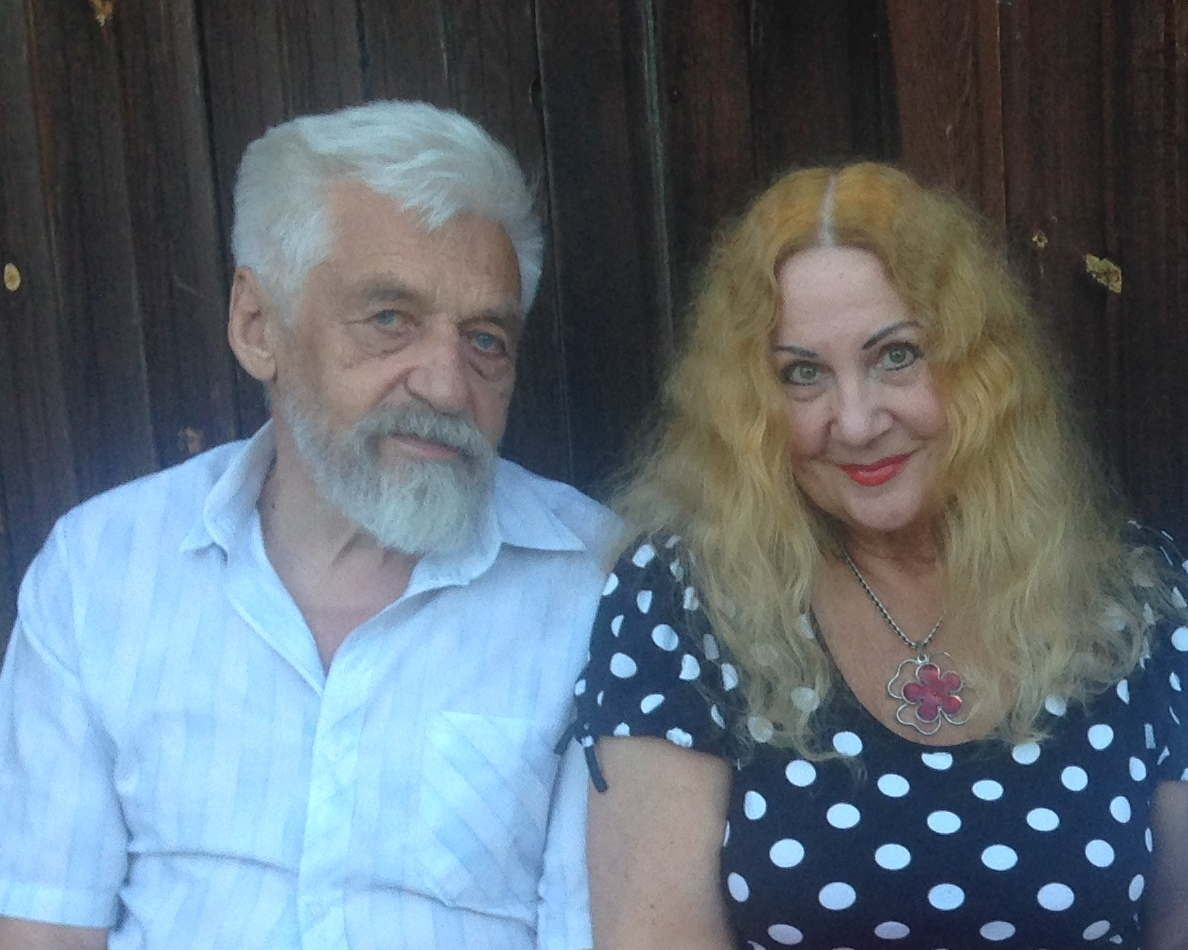
Ovchinnikov and Elvira Chastikova, 2018

In the reading room of the Central Library of Obninsk he met Elvira Chastikova (2003), who later would become his wife:

Suddenly I saw him, and heard, and felt, - Elvira recalls - and it happened quite suddenly, as if I was standing with downcast eyes and just looked up. Frankly speaking, I was frightened, I thought that we should get out of here, because at home were my husband, children, grandchildren. But it turned out that it was too late to run from this new feeling, I missed that moment…

— Elena Tsygankova, Vladimir Ovchinnikov // Faces Magazine 2007, September

The search in non-traditional areas led Ovchinnikov to graffiti and wall painting:

Becoming old, people make a lot of discoveries, which they were not thinking about their whole life. For me such discovery was the fact that I know how to draw

— Izvestiya, 8 February 2006

Ovchinnikov died on 13 May 2026, at the age of 88.

== Murals by Vladimir Ovchinnikov ==
Gallery Murals by Vladimir Ovchinnikov in the houses of the city Borovsk
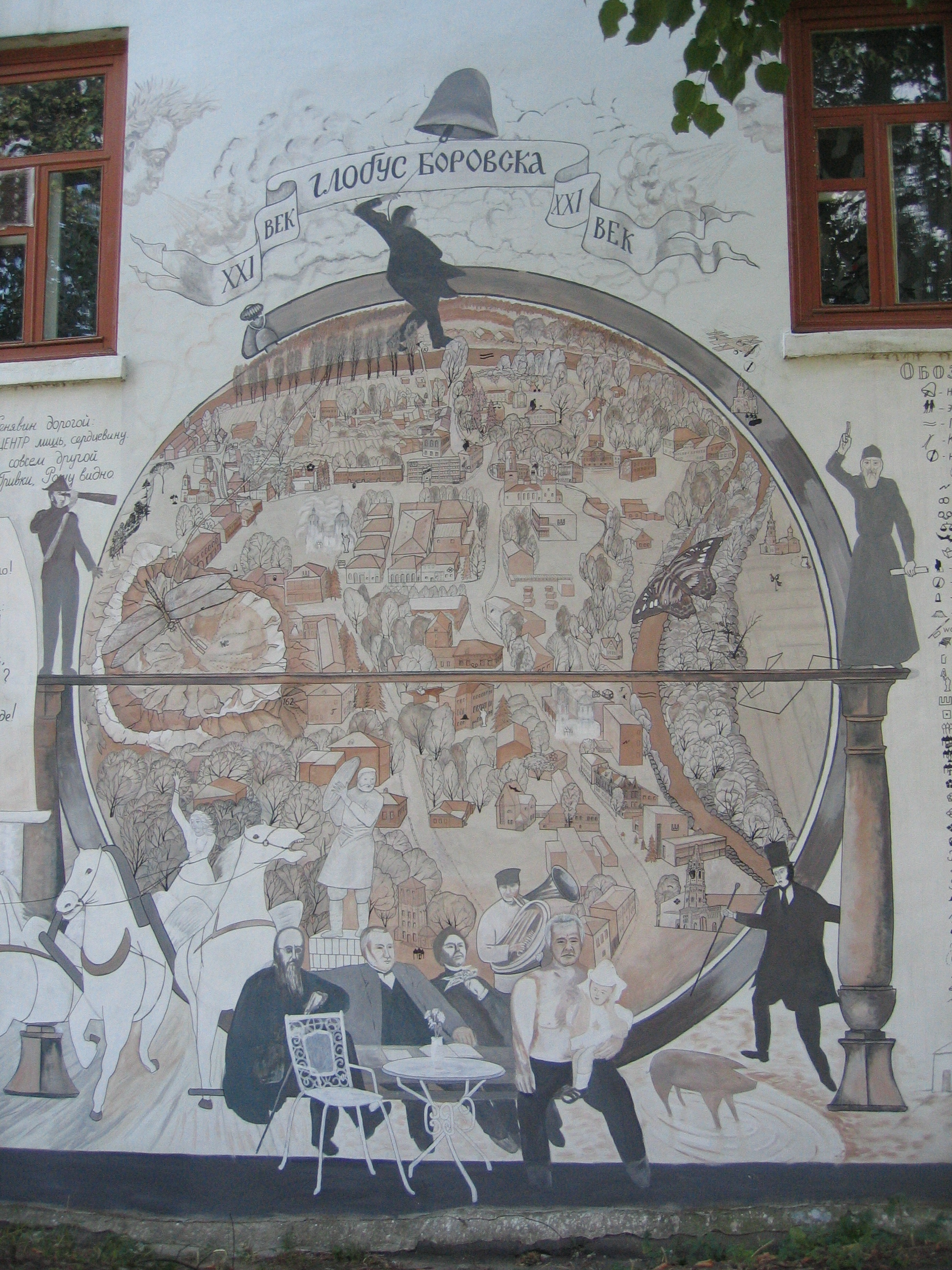
Wall image «Globe of Borovsk»

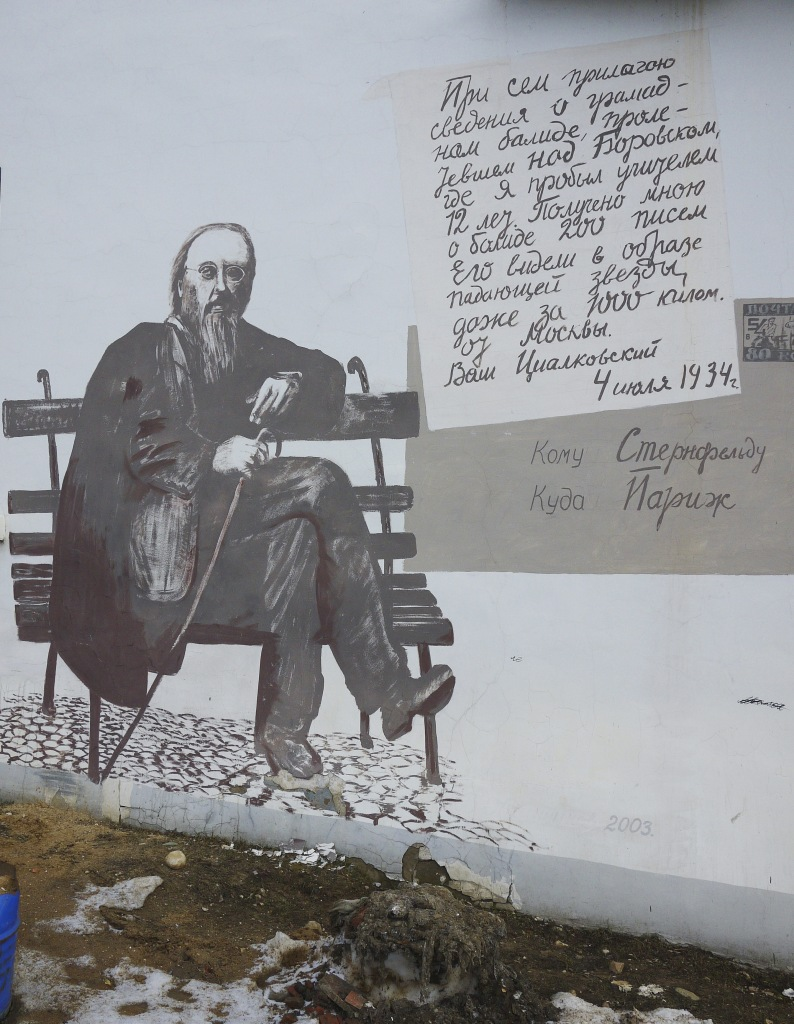
Wall image «Konstantin Tsiolkovsky»

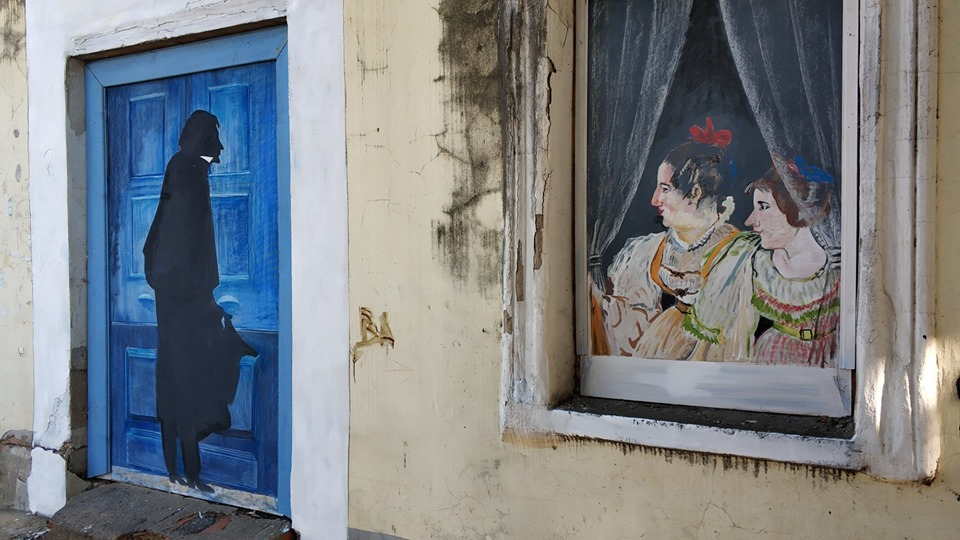
Wall image «Gogol»

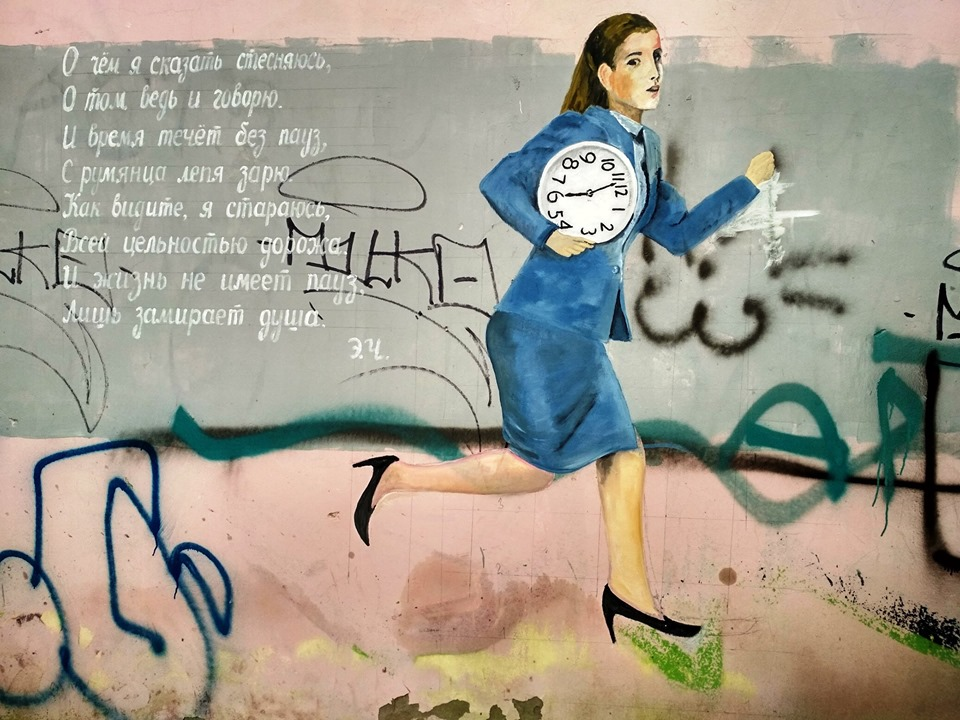
Wall image «Chasing Time»

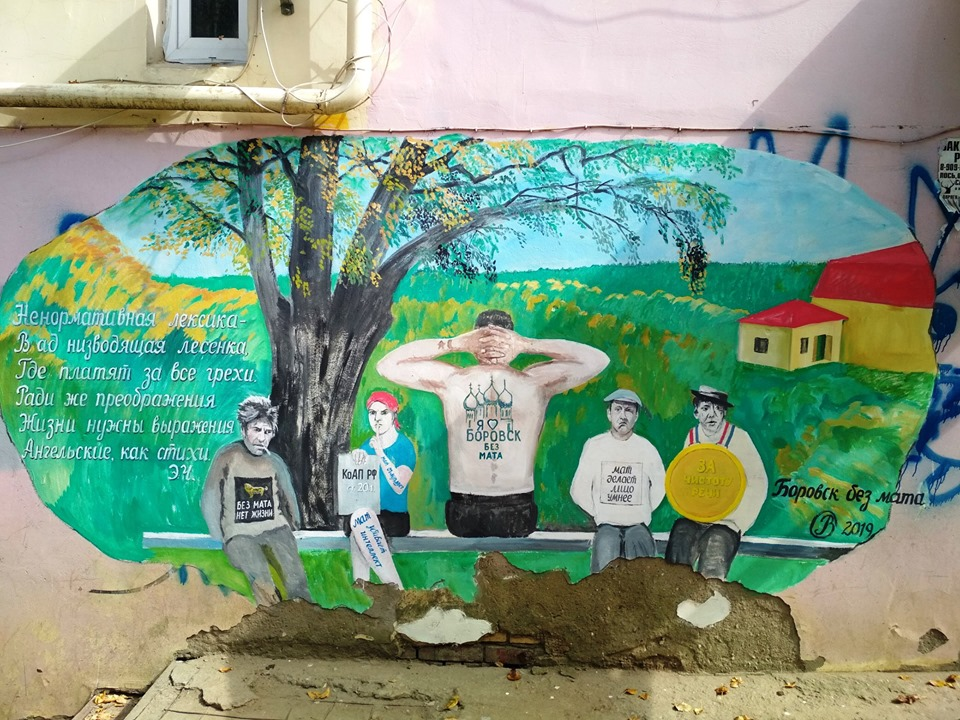
Wall image «Without Profanity»

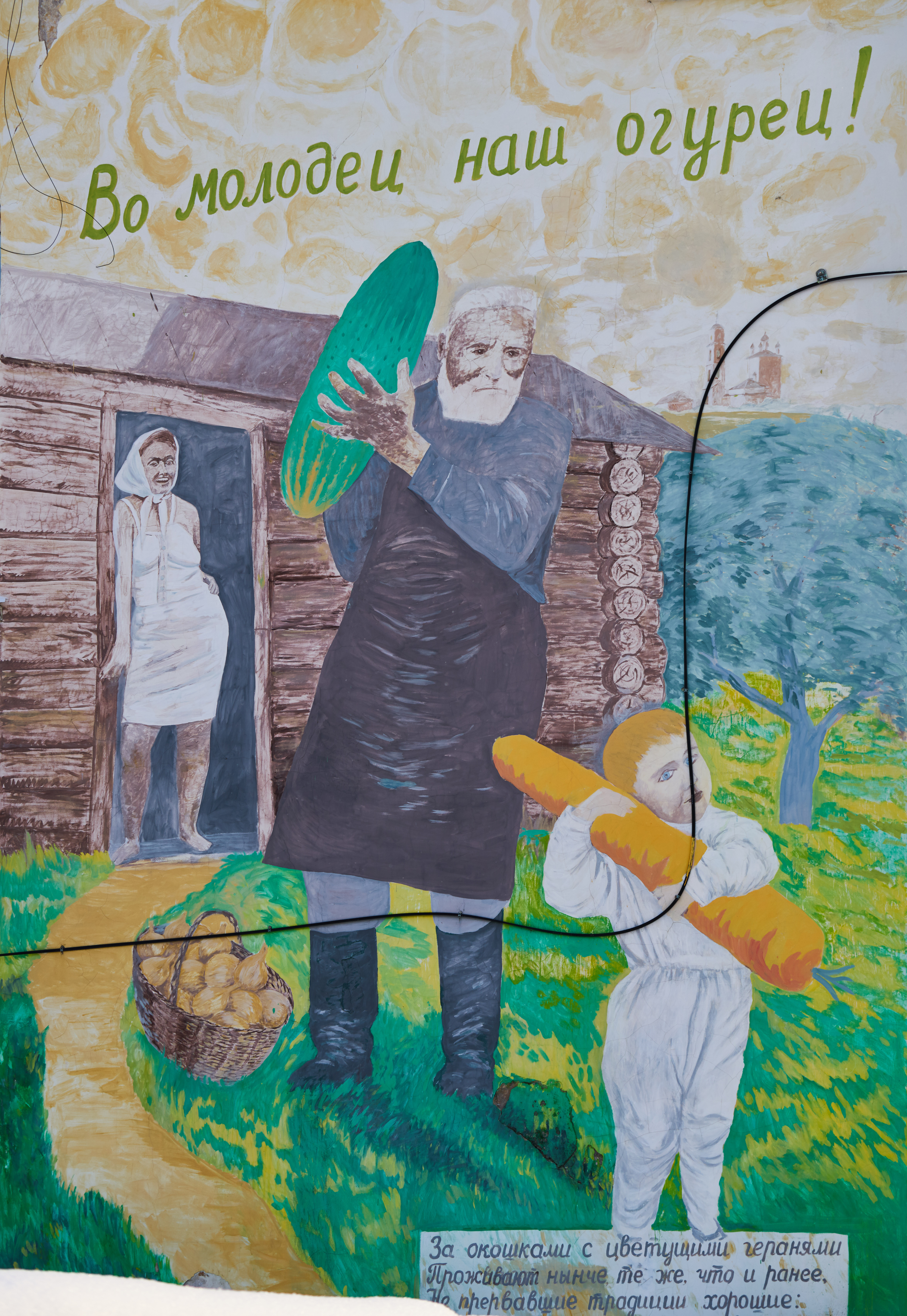
Wall image «Good fellow, our cucumber!»

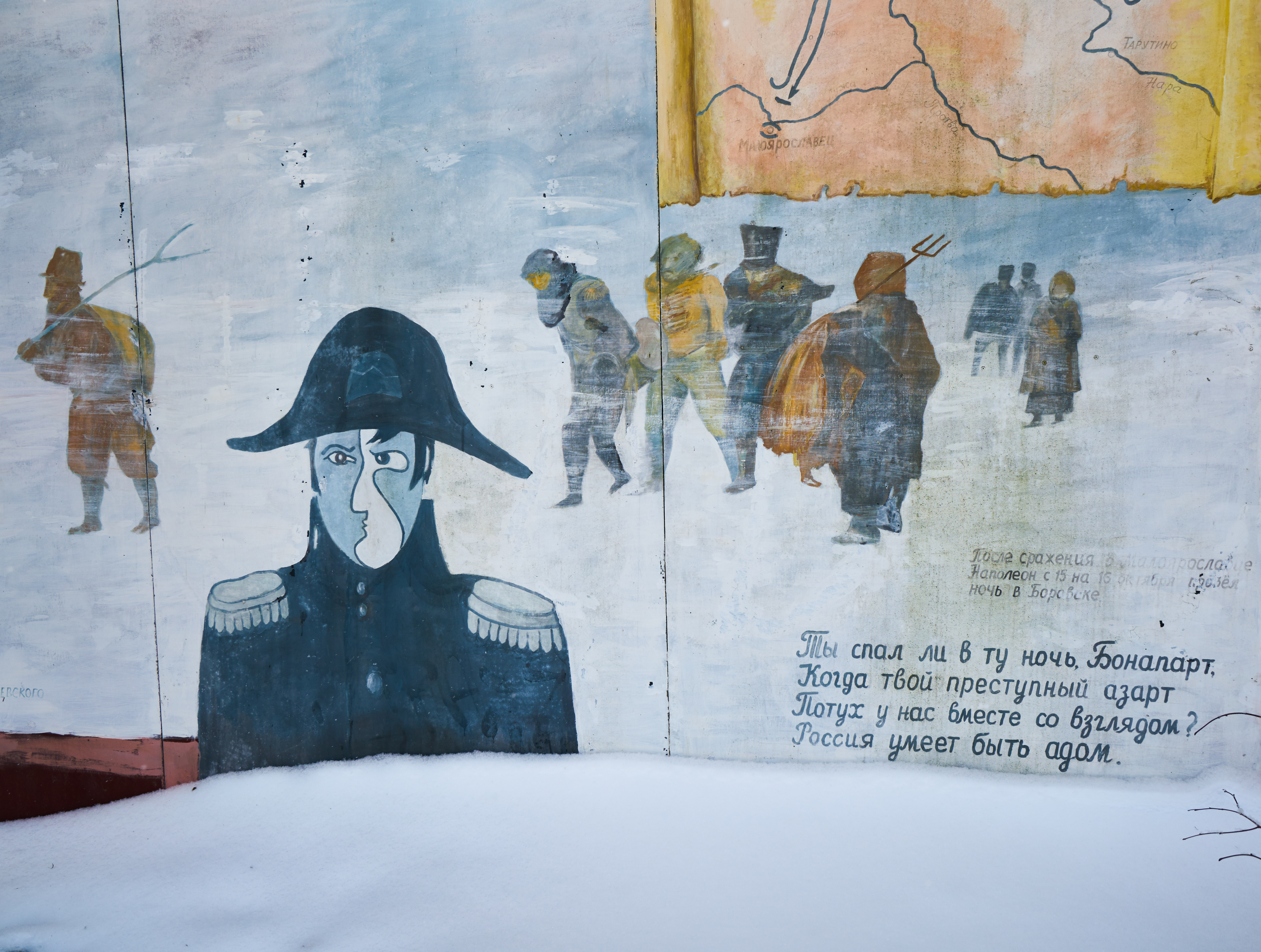
Wall image «Bonaparte's retreat»

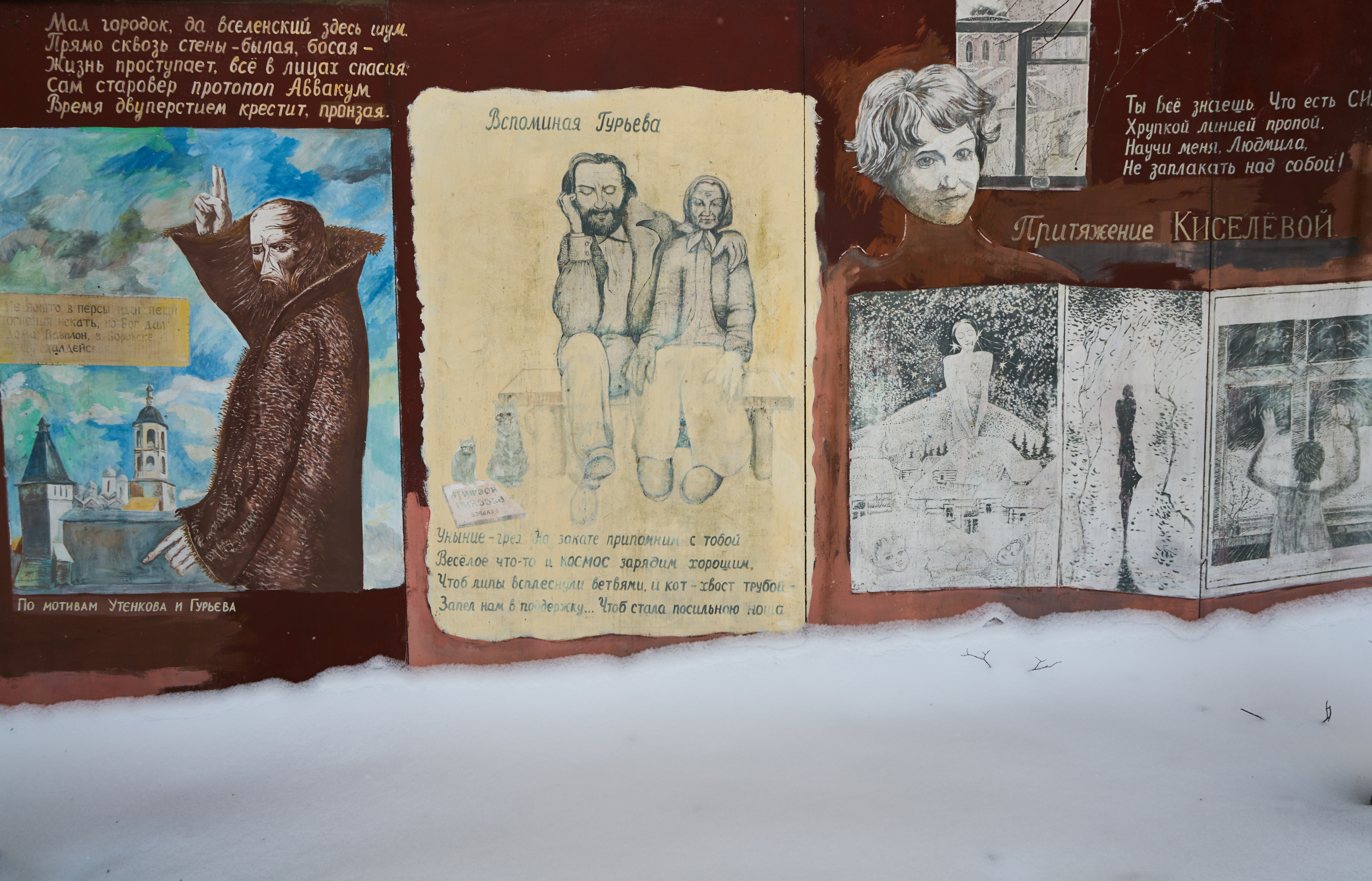

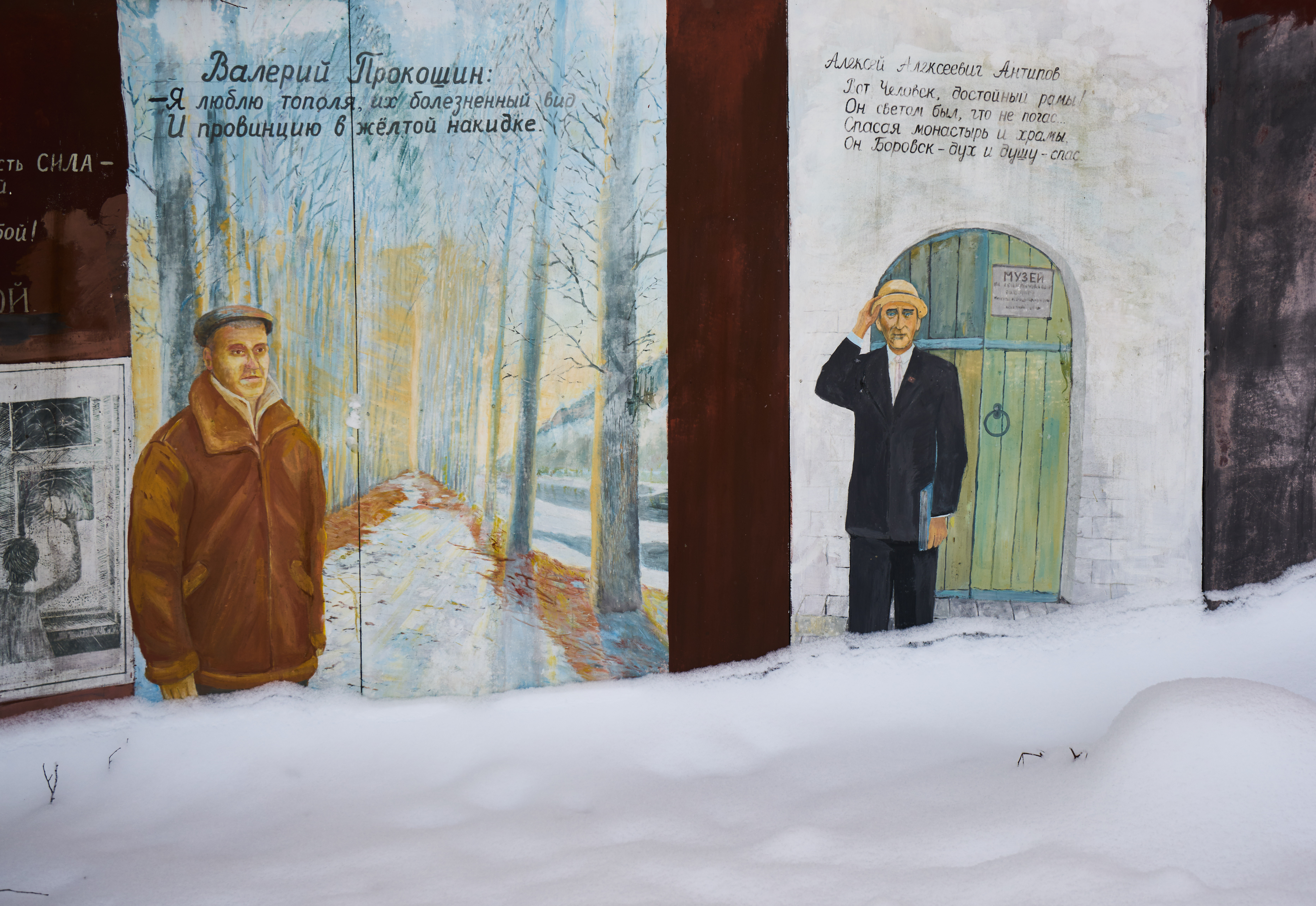

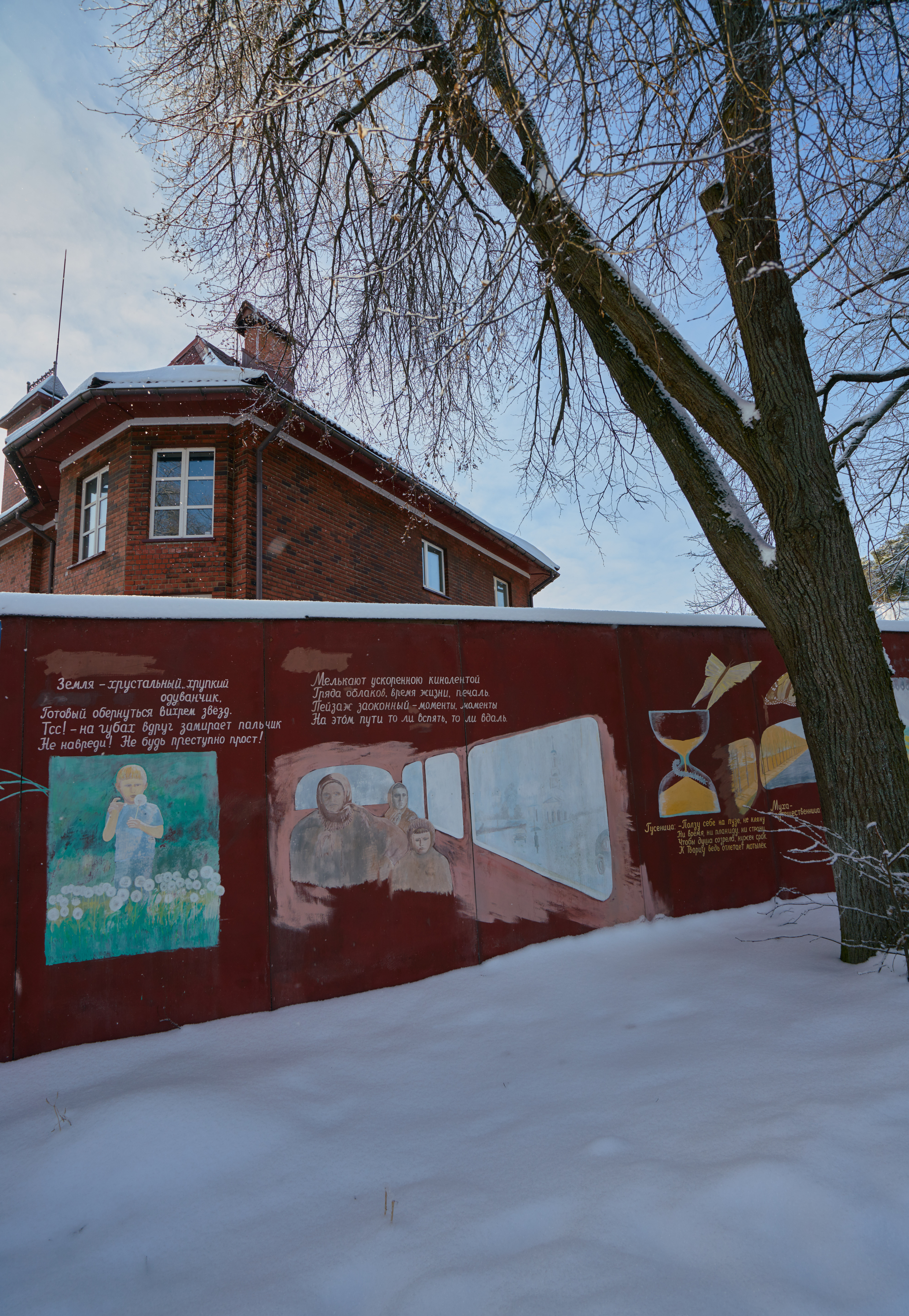

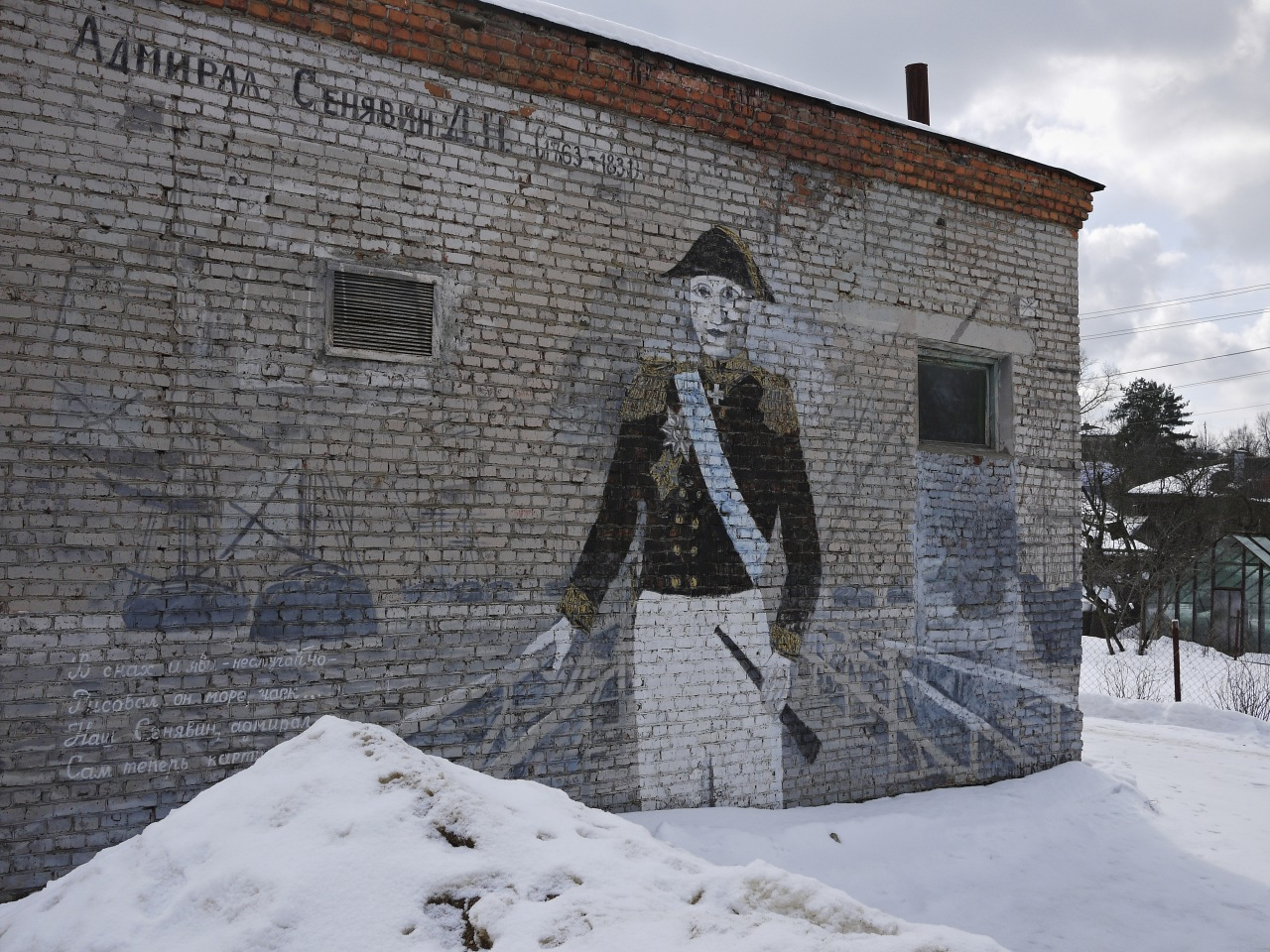
Wall image «Admiral Senyavin»

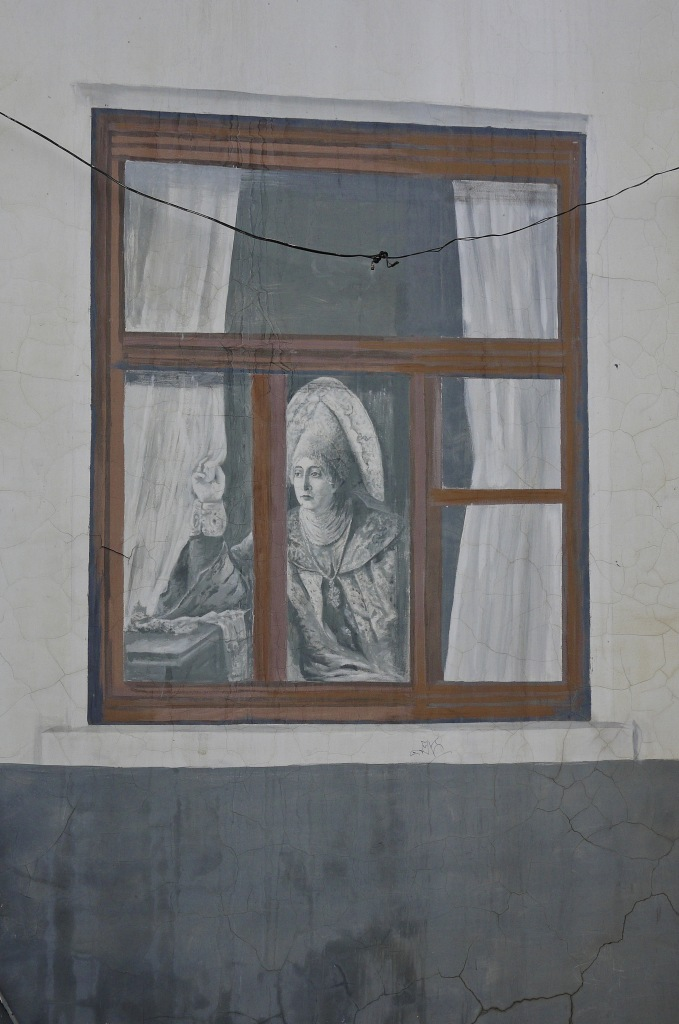
Wall image «Boyarynya in the window»

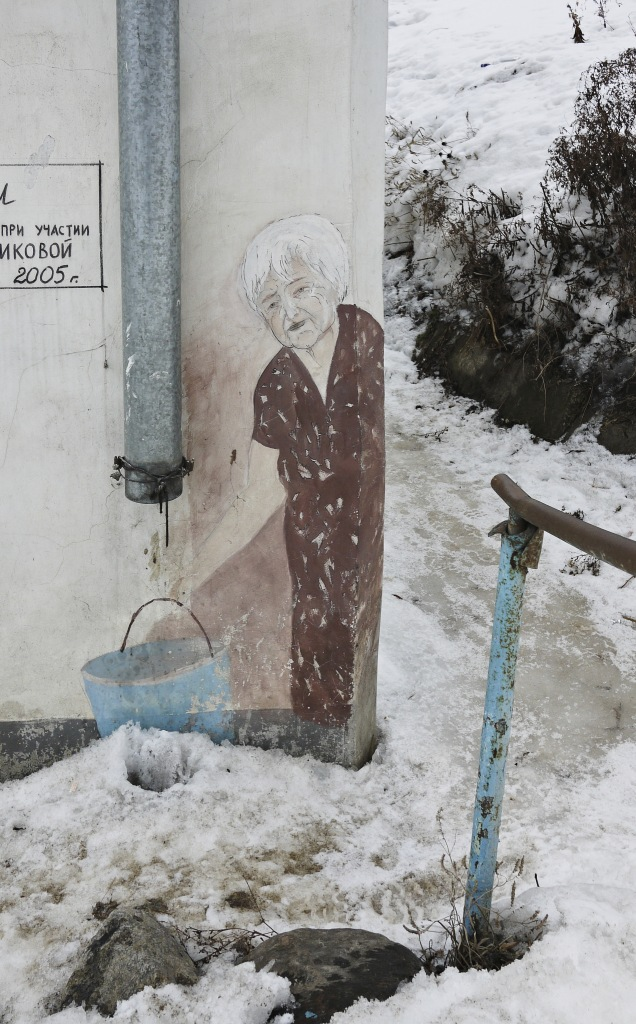
Wall image «Bucket»

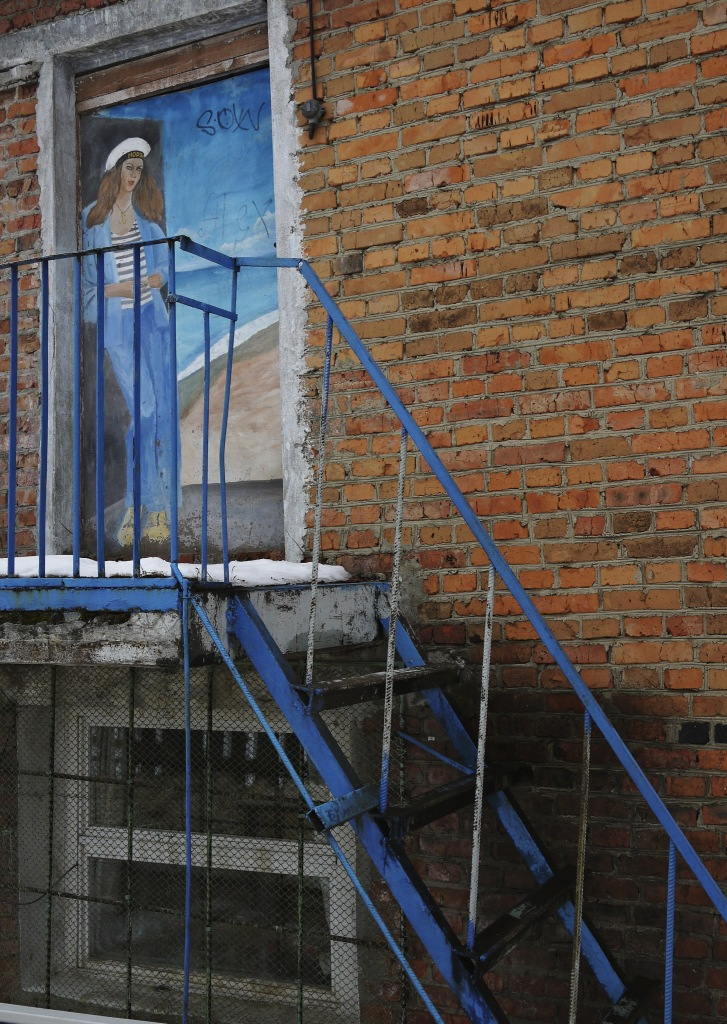

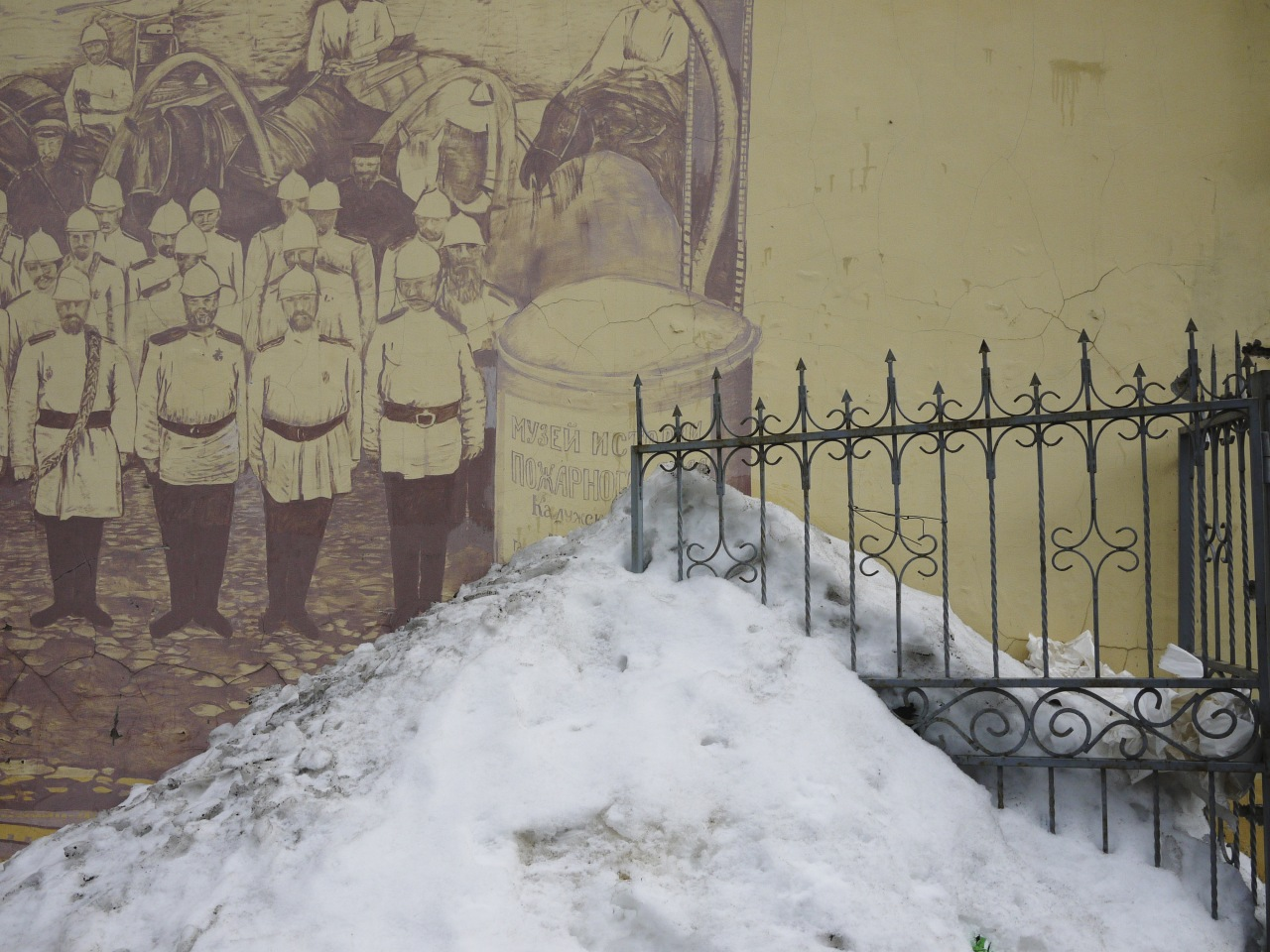
Wall image «Fire brigade»

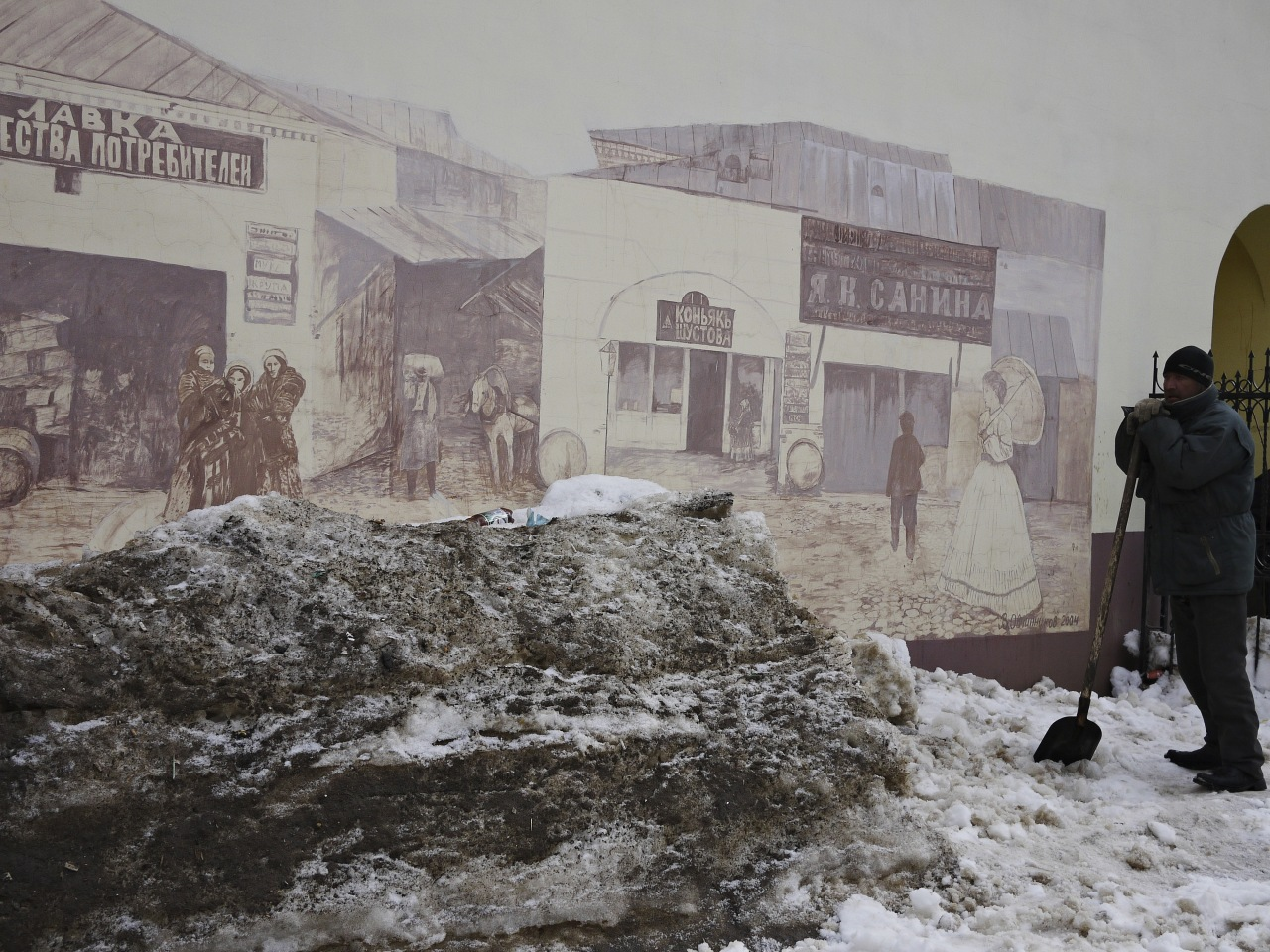

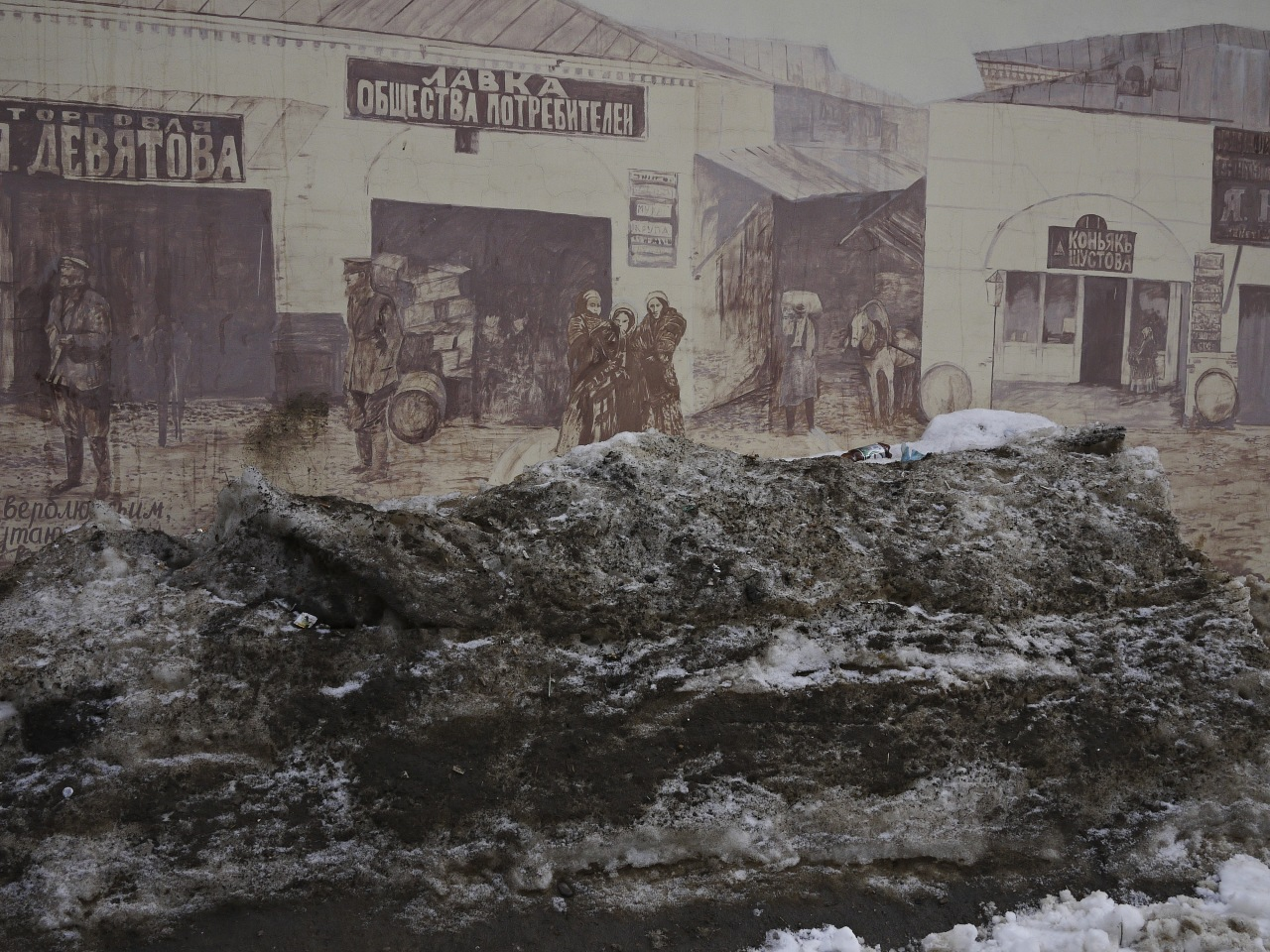

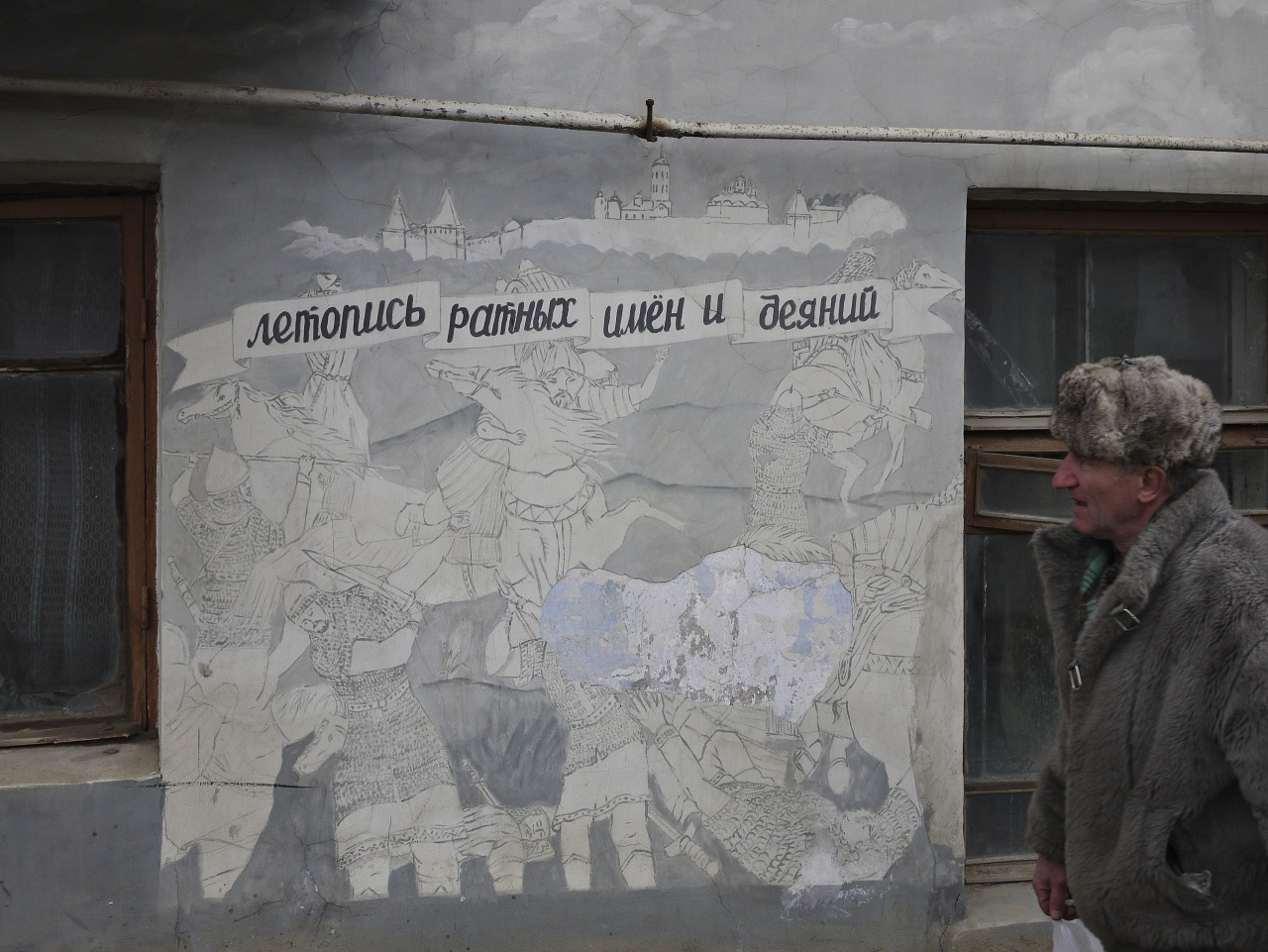
Chronicle of military names and deeds

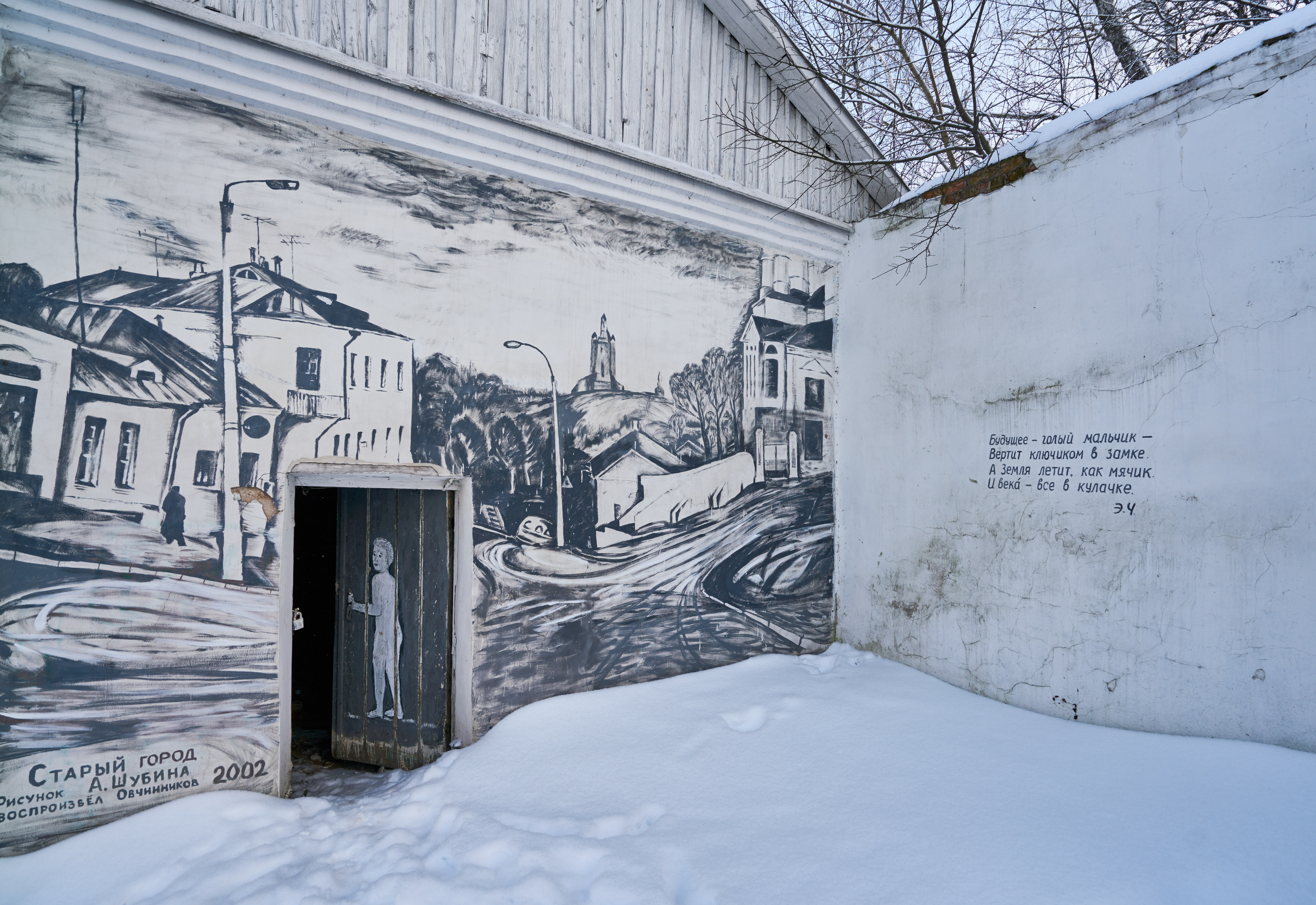

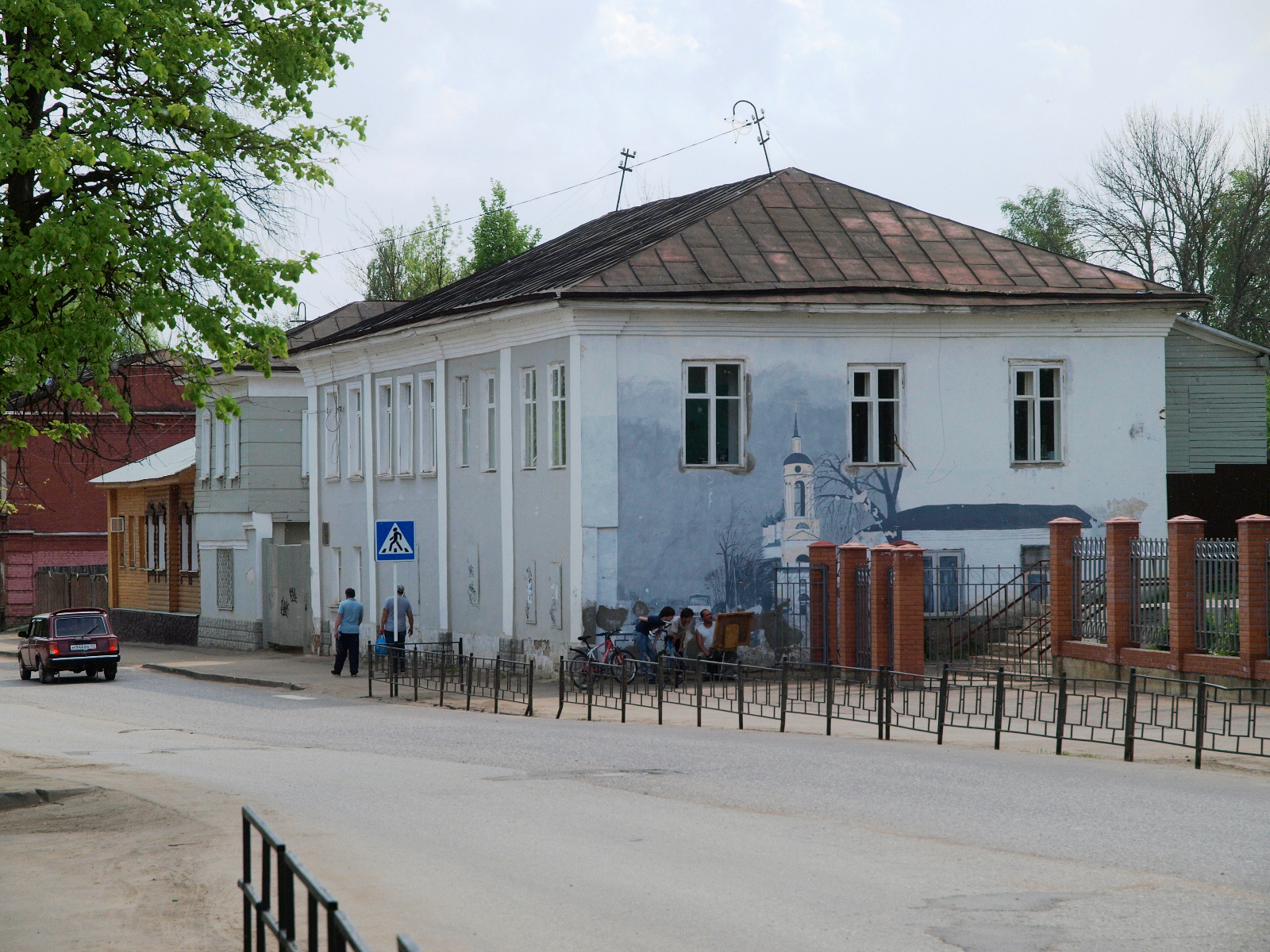
Wall image «Cathedral»

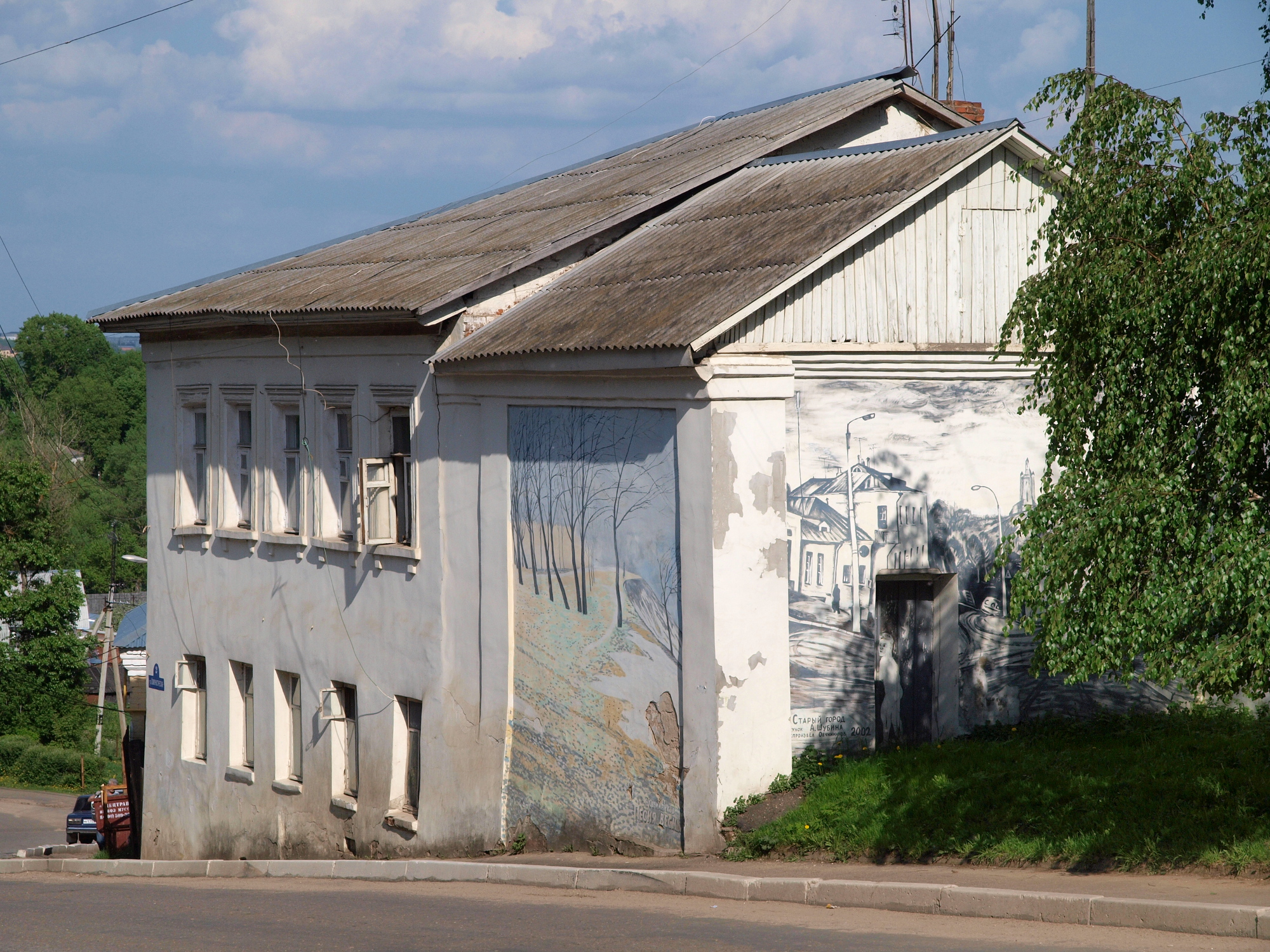
Wall image «Old Borovsk»

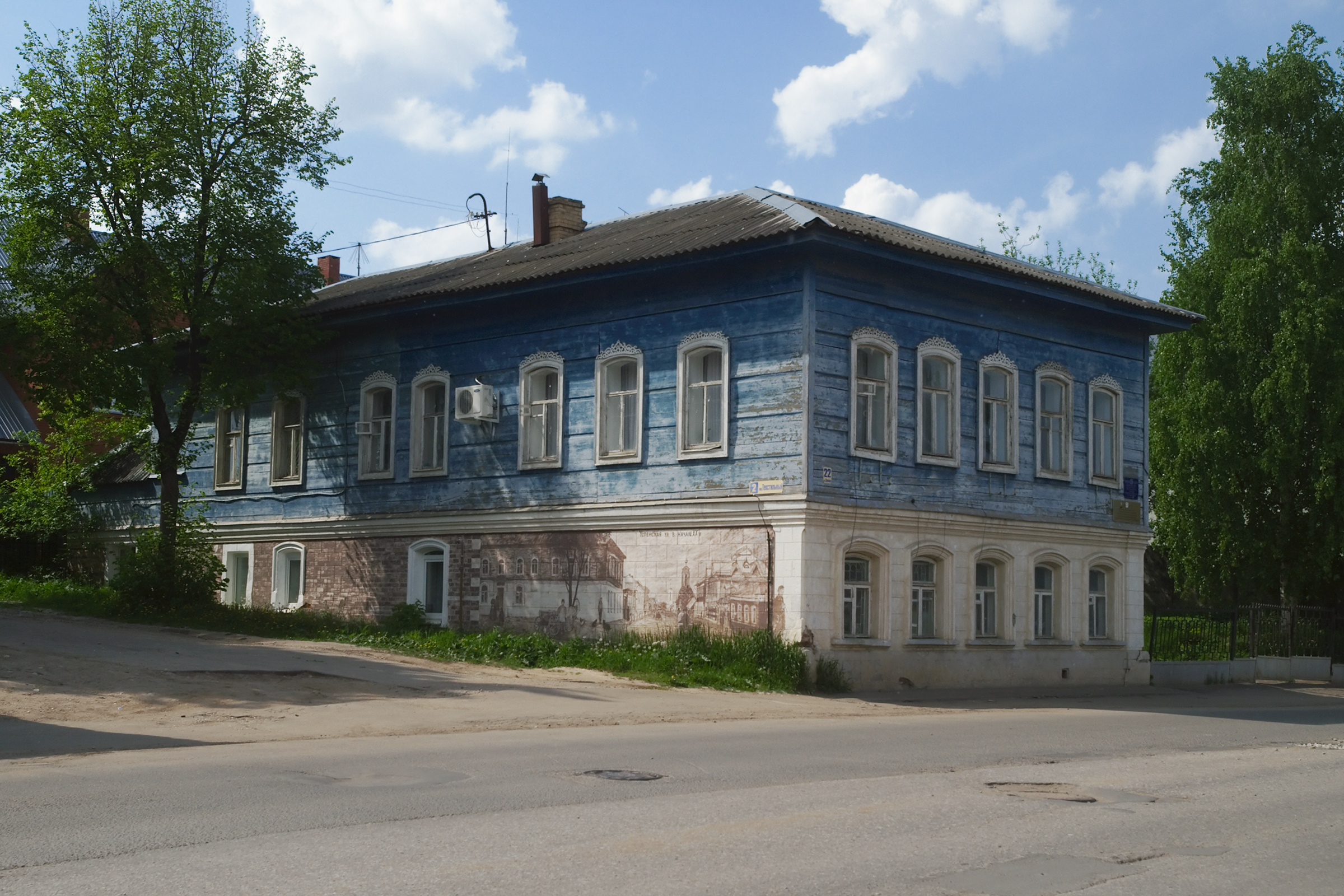
Wall image «Old Borovsk»

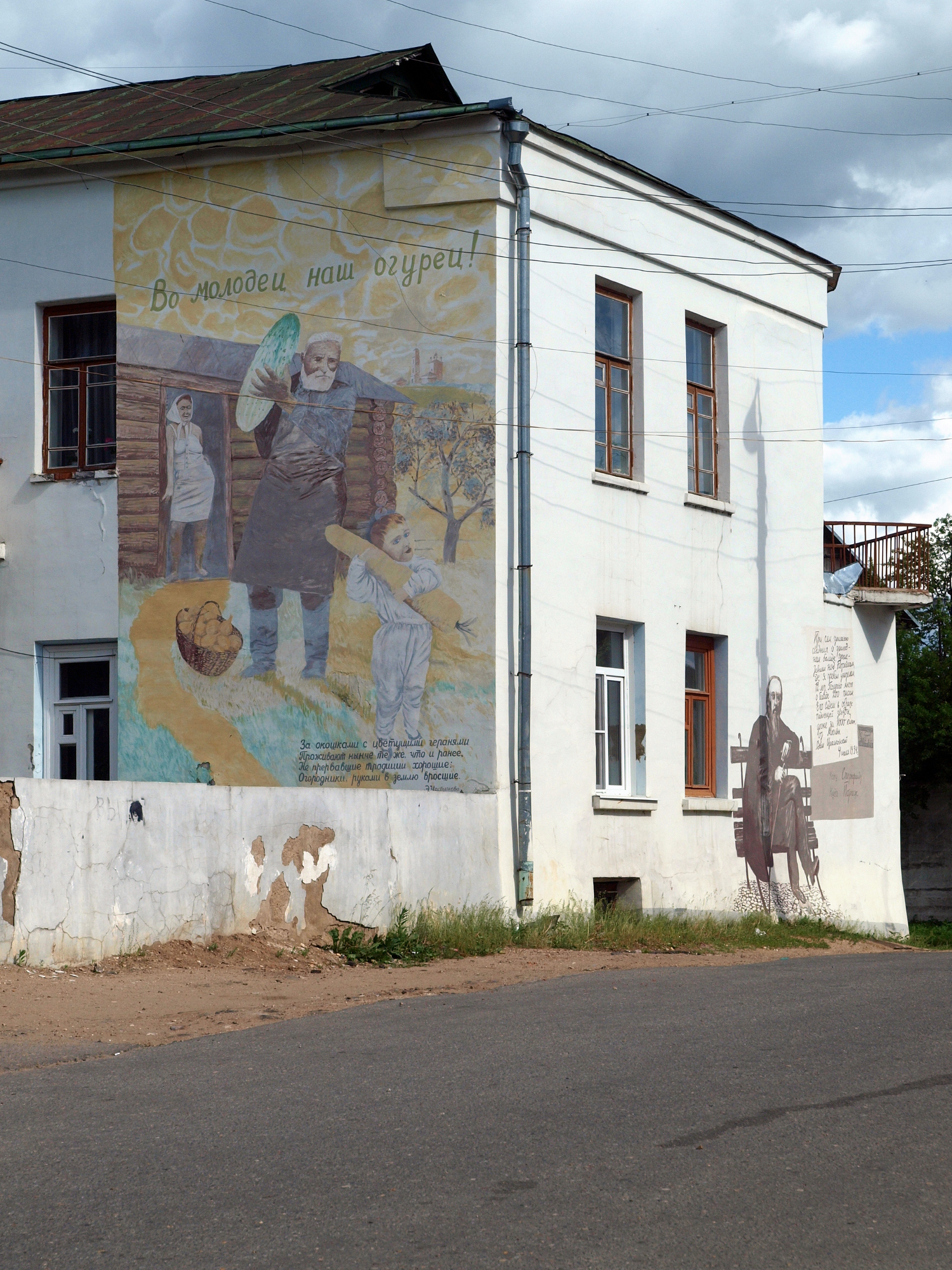
Wall image «Gardeners of Borovsk» and «Tsiolkovsky»

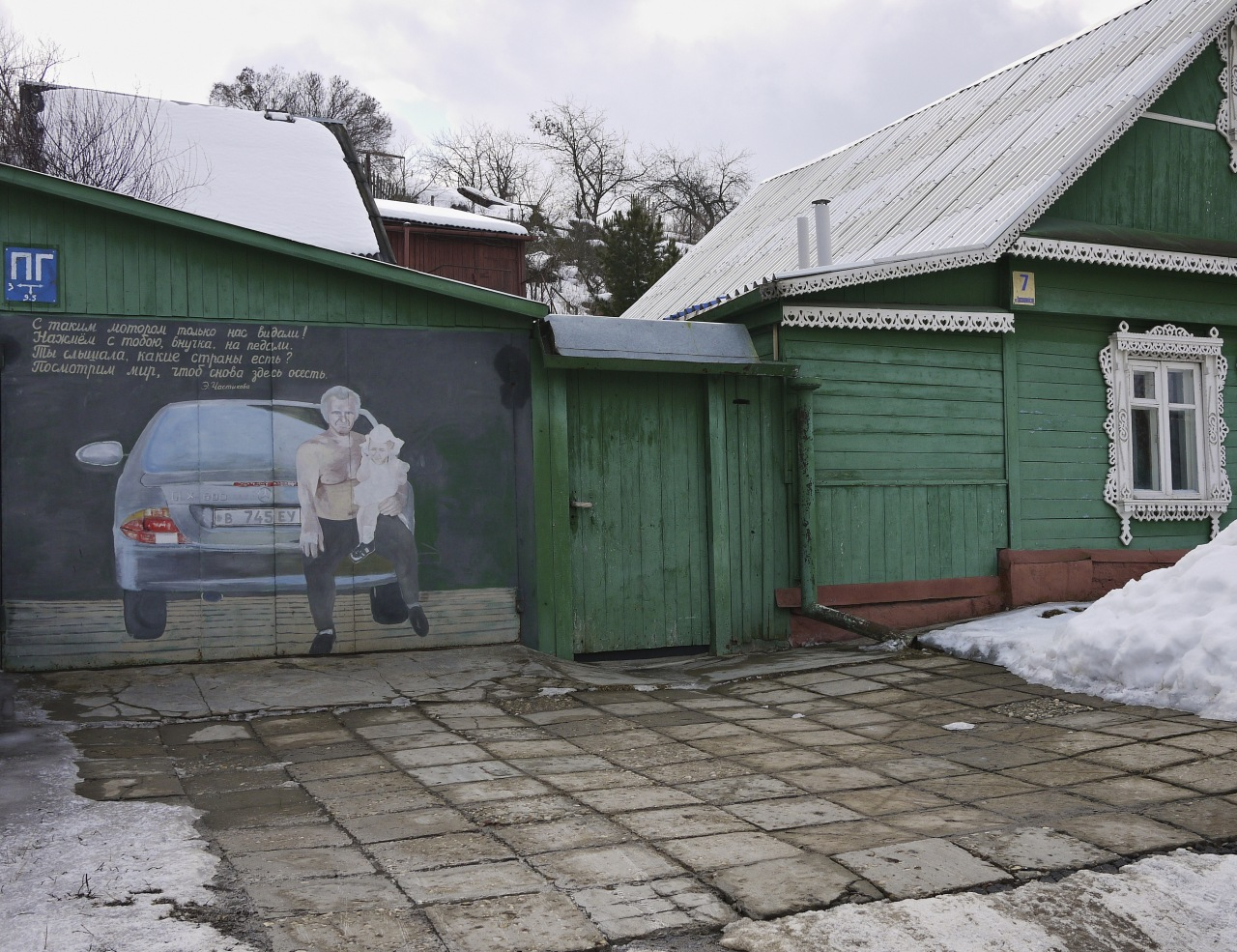
Drawing on the garage door

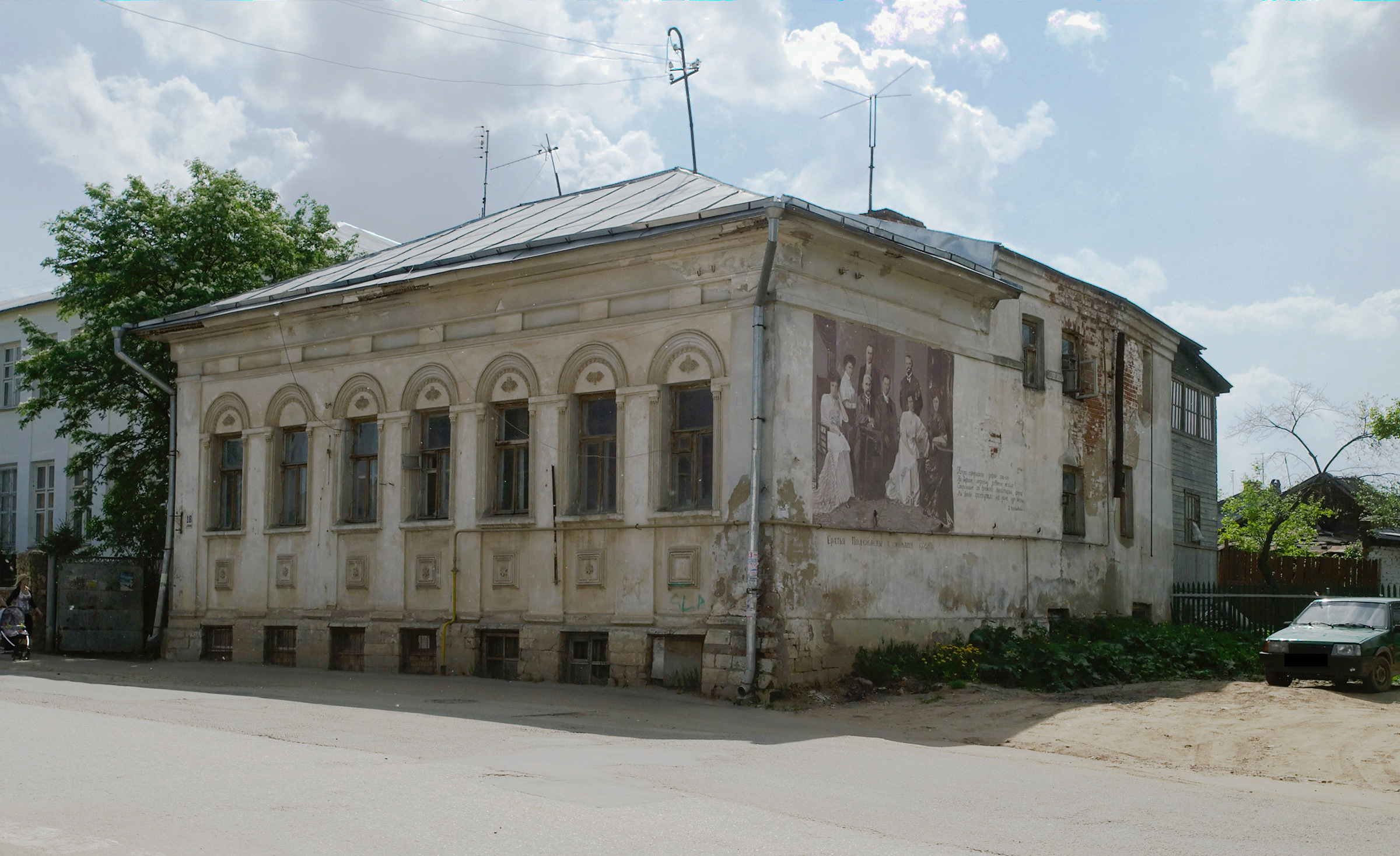
Wall image «Family Polezhaeva»

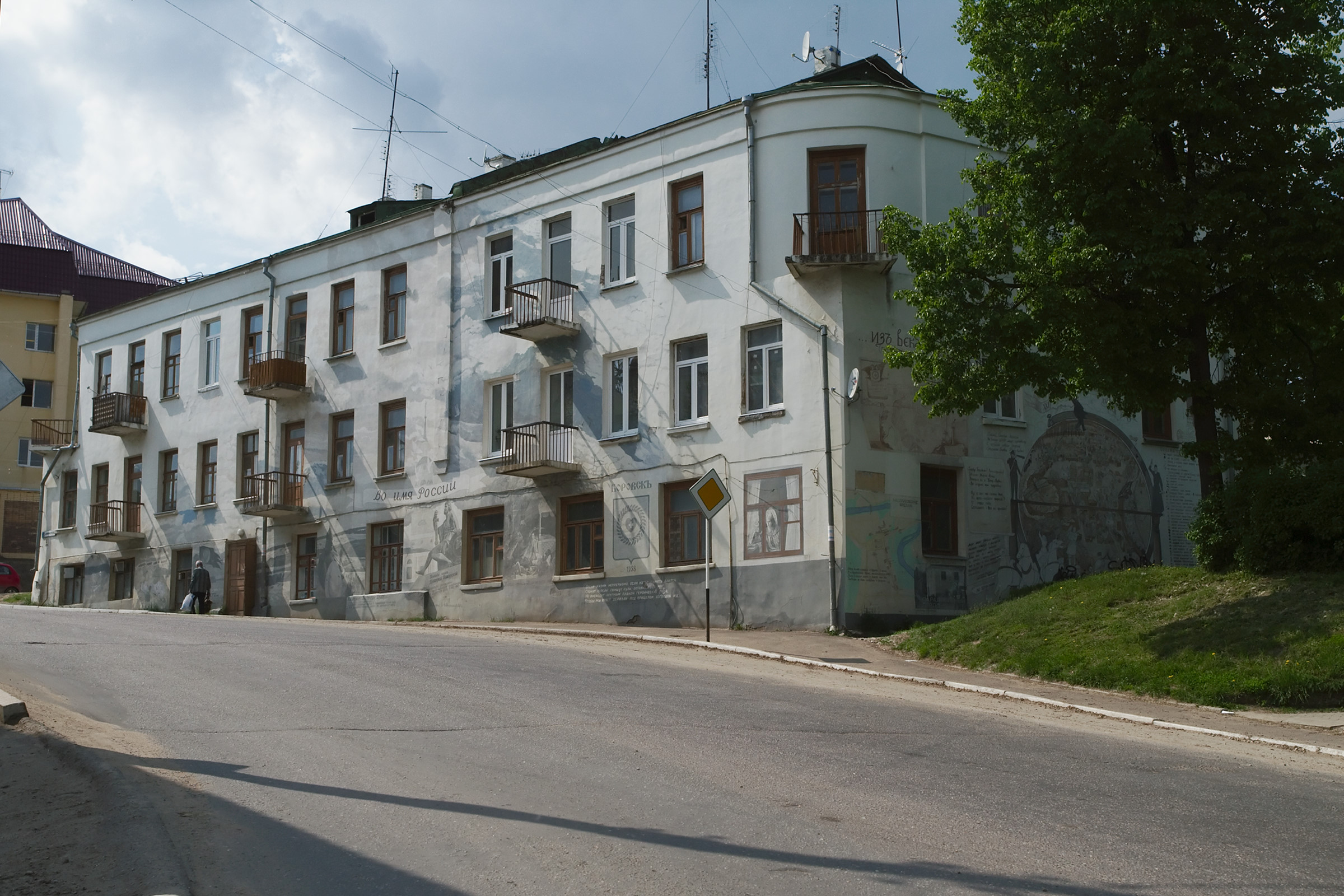
Wall image «Globe Borovsk»

During four summer seasons (2002–2005), Ovchinnikov, a self-taught artist, made about a hundred paintings on the houses of Borovsk, creating on the dull blank walls of city buildings, boarded-up windows, fences, about 90 different subjects (his famous countrymen, churches, historical events, genre scenes: a girl walking on the pipe of a pipeline, an old woman with a bucket near a downspout, a naked boy knocking at the locked door, a man with a giant cucumber in the hands, and an old man in his window reading, etc.). His themes were chosen and selected with the help of his wife. Many of the paintings are accompanied by poems written by her.

It occurred to me that all local artists should be transferred to the walls of buildings presenting their works in an enlarged view. But all other artists refused: one referred to the fact that his health does not allow him, others, for other reasons, like age, some said that it does not allow to make money. Then I decided to go to our mayor and to offer him to paint the walls on my own.

== Ovchinnikov's Star Ship ==
Gallery Ovchinnikov's Star Ship
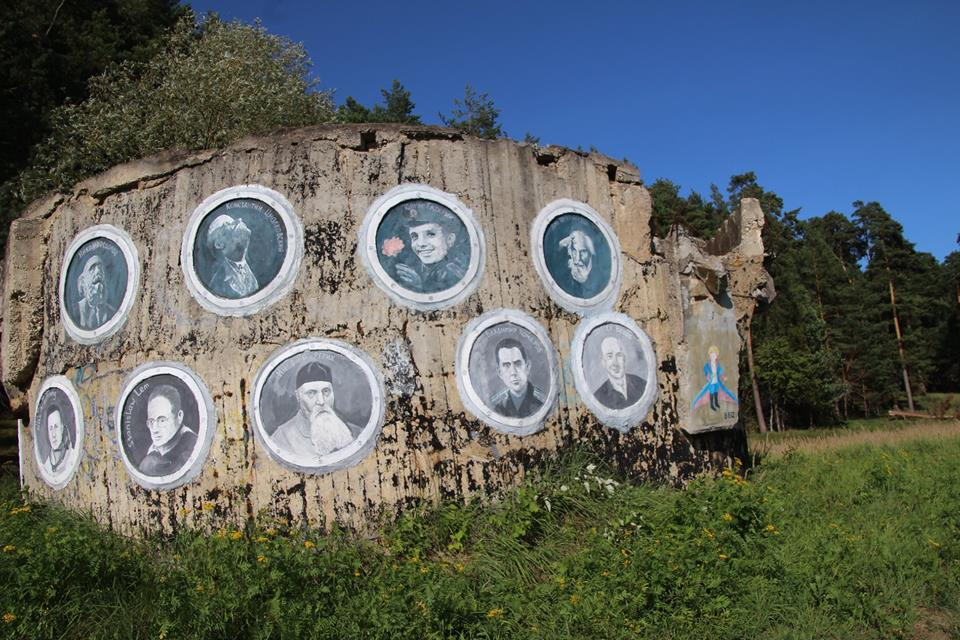
Cosmic Ark

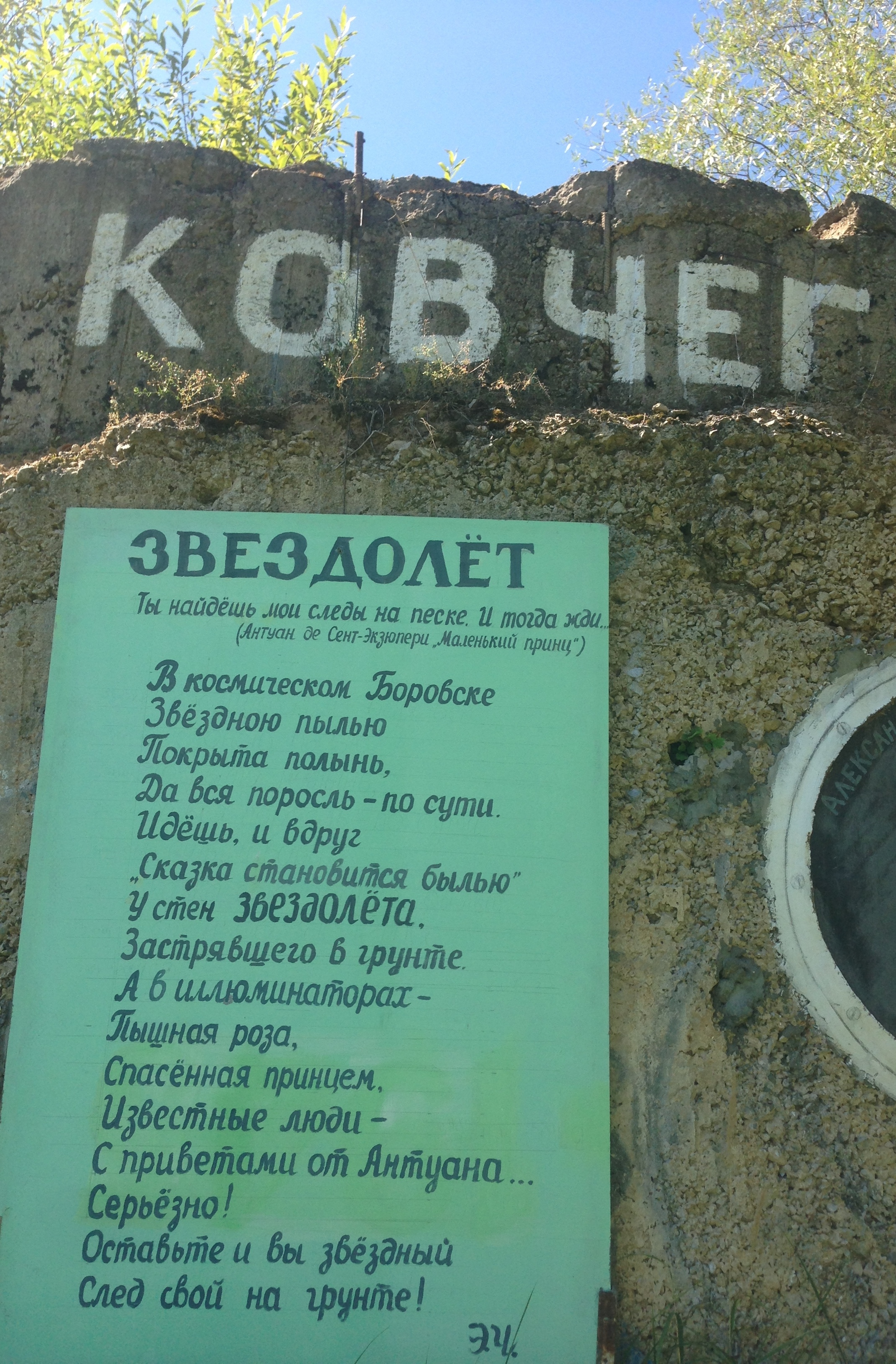
Space Ark

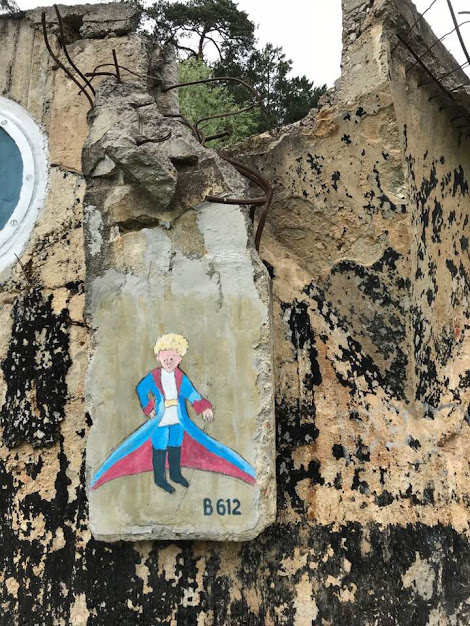
The Little Prince

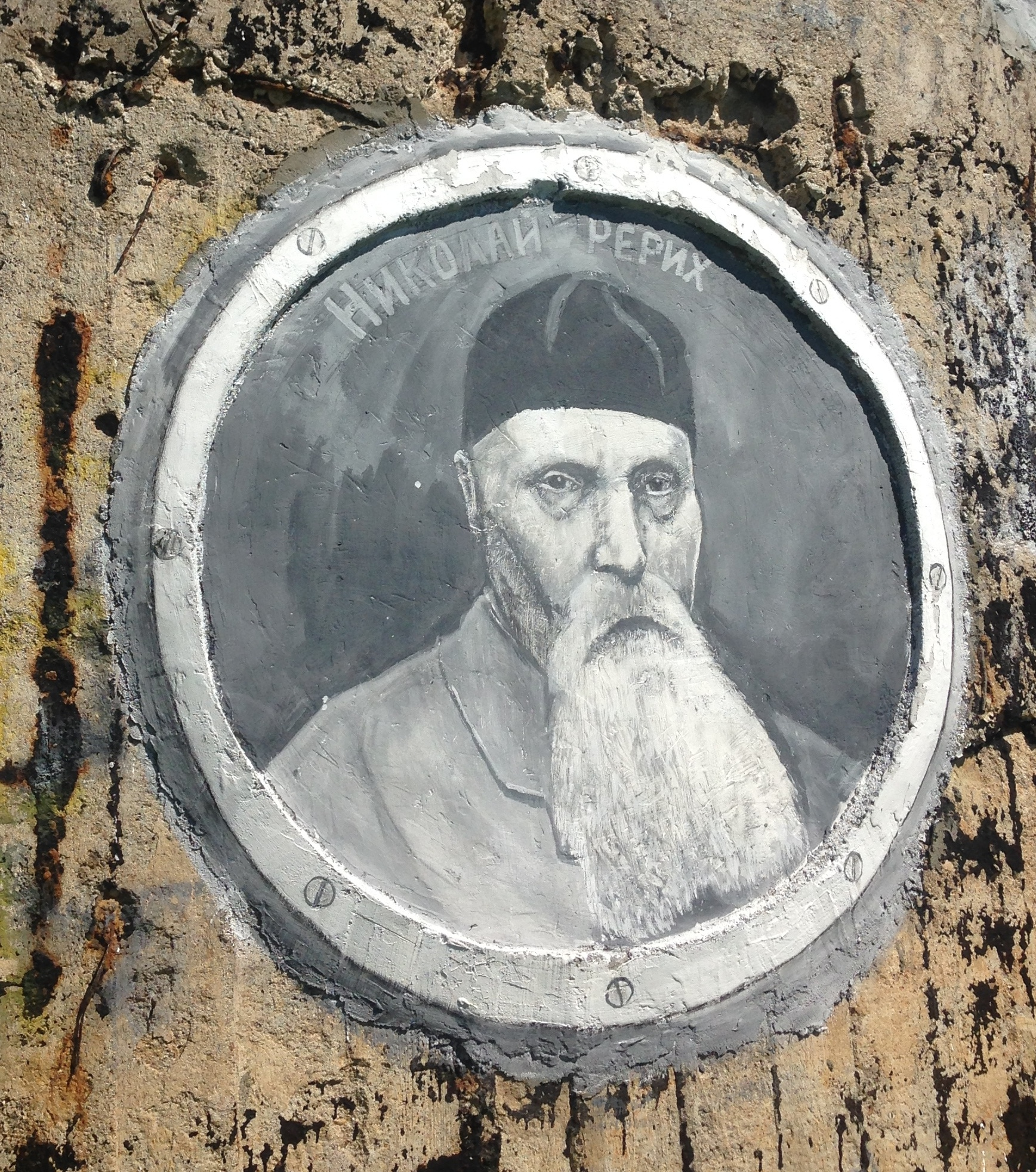
Nikolai Roerich

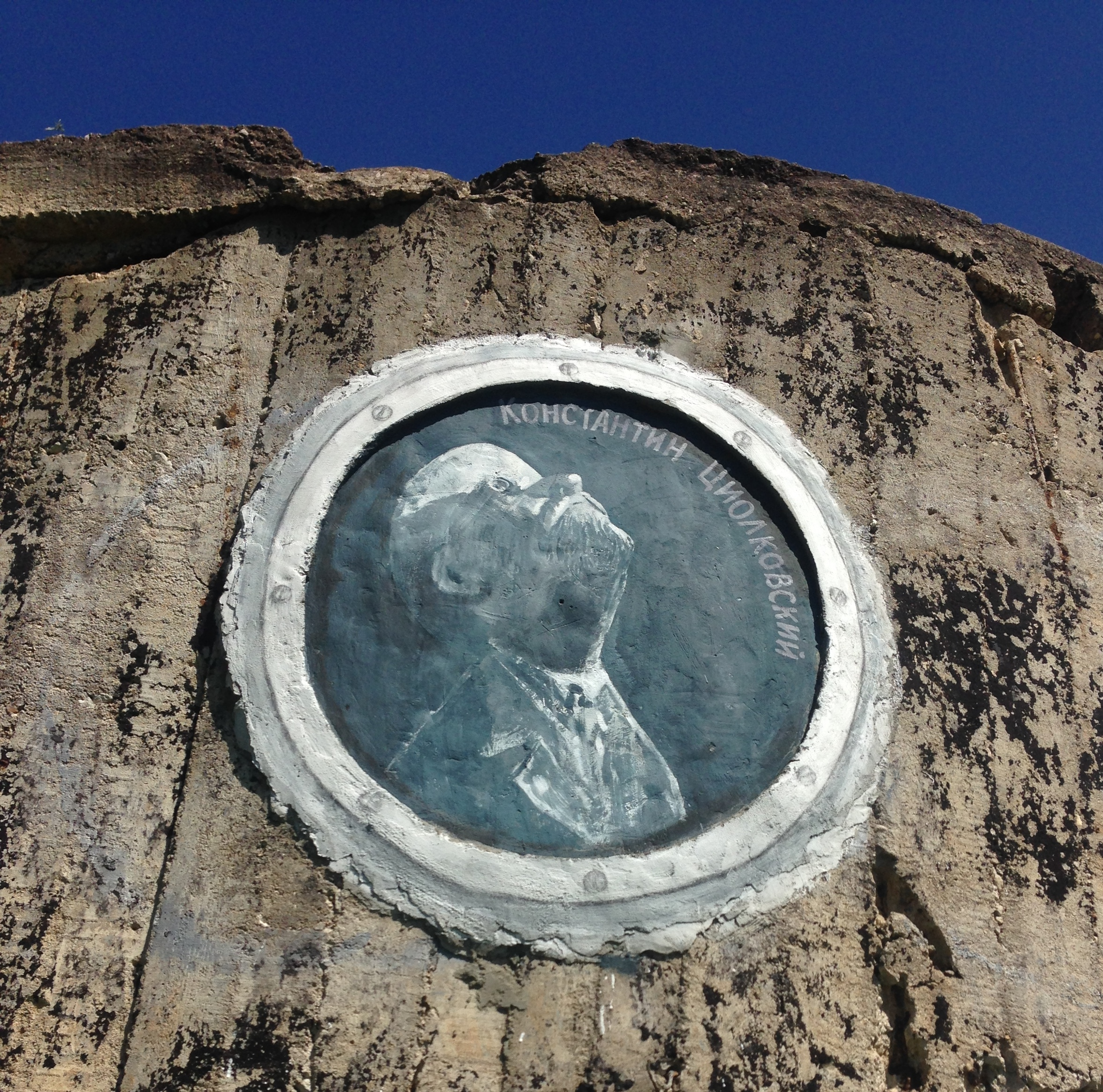
Konstantin Tsiolkovsky

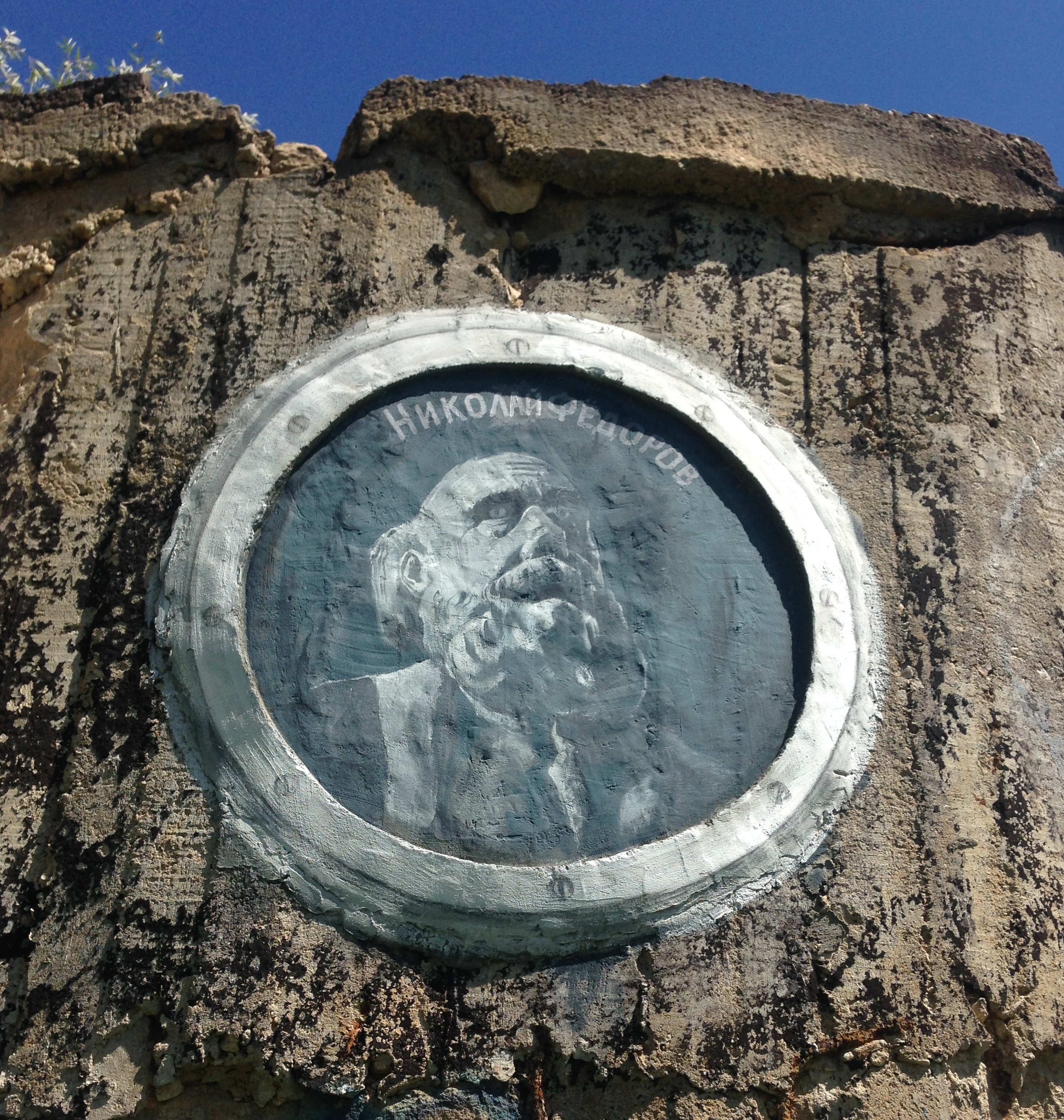
Nikolai Fyodorov

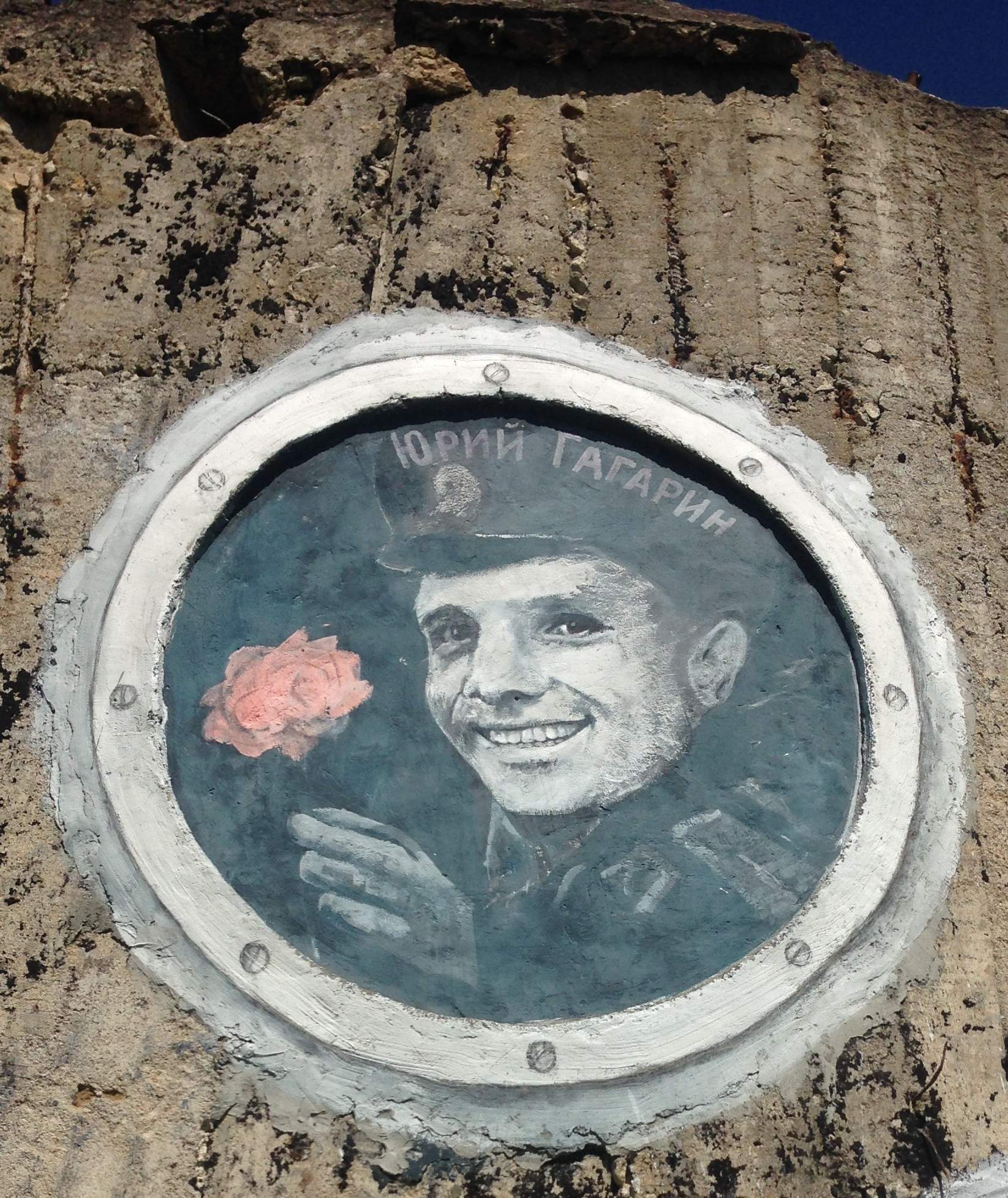
Yuri Gagarin

Ovchinnikov's Star Ship is an art object in Borovsk, representing a 10-meter concrete cylinder with images of outstanding space scientists, writers, and cosmonauts. Ovchinnikov also turned an abandoned building into a 'Space Ark'.

== Gallery repressed ==
A gallery of 20 portraits from photos of repressed citizens Borovsk district was created on the concrete wall in the center of the city of Borovsk in August 2016. The gallery includes portraits of 20 citizens of Borovsk shot in 1937–1938. The memorial contains the inscription – "For whom the bell ringing Borovsk ...". The gallery was destroyed by vandals in three days after the opening of the memorial. The event caused a wide resonance in the media.

Gallery For whom the bell ringing Borovsk (reconstruction)
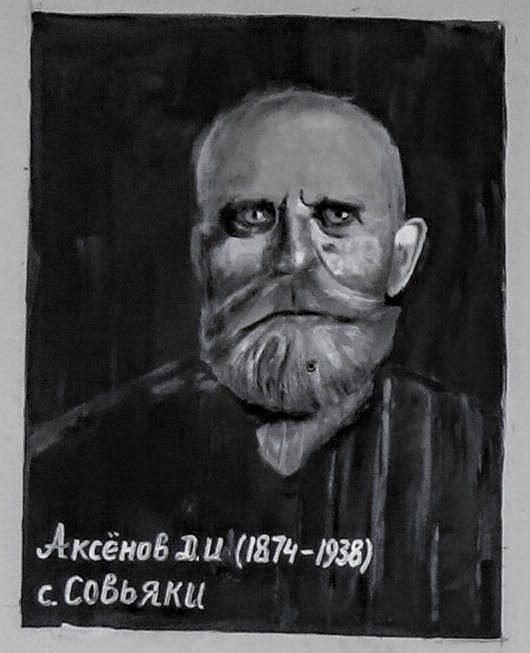
Dmitrij Aksyonov
(1874-1938) - a native and resident of the village Sovyaki.
Shot in 1938

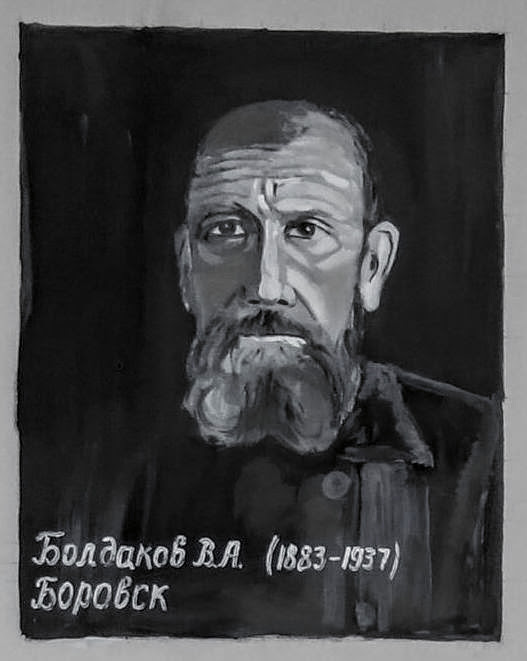
Vasilij Boldakov
(1883-1937) - a native and resident of Borovsk.
Shot in 1937

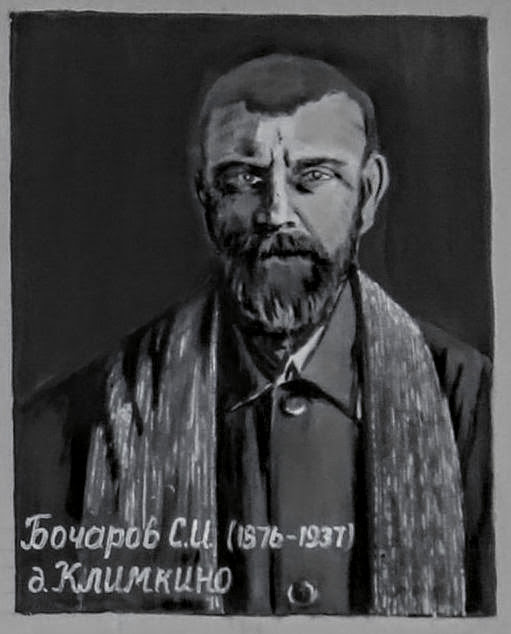
Spiridon Bocharov
(1876-1937) - a native and resident of the village Klimkino.
Shot in 1937

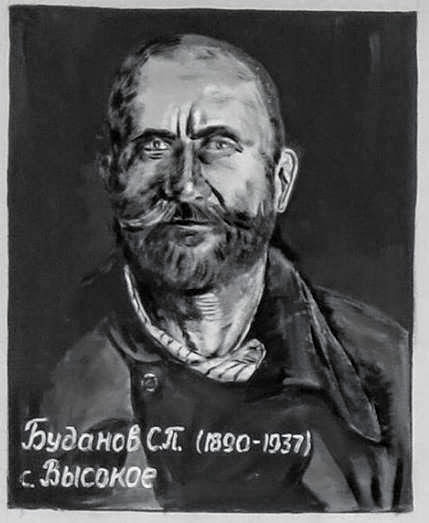
Semyon Budanov
(1890-1937) - a native and resident of the village Vysokoe.
Shot in 1937

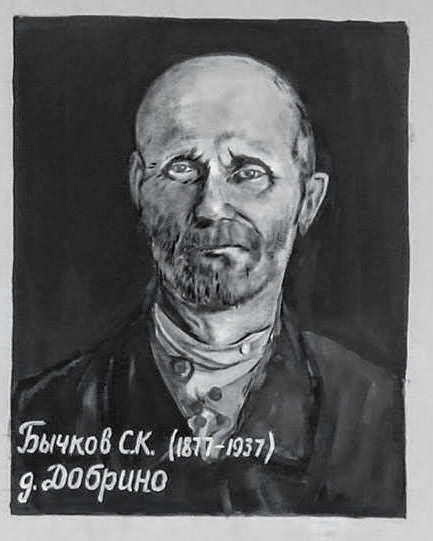
Sergej Bychkov
(1877-1937) - a native and resident of the village Dobrino.
Shot in 1937

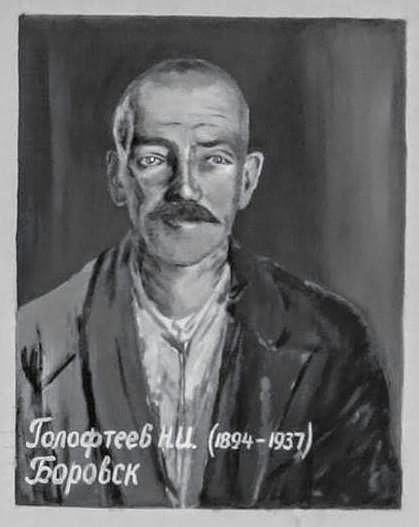
Nikolaj Golofteev
(1894-1937) - a native and resident of Borovsk.
Shot in 1937

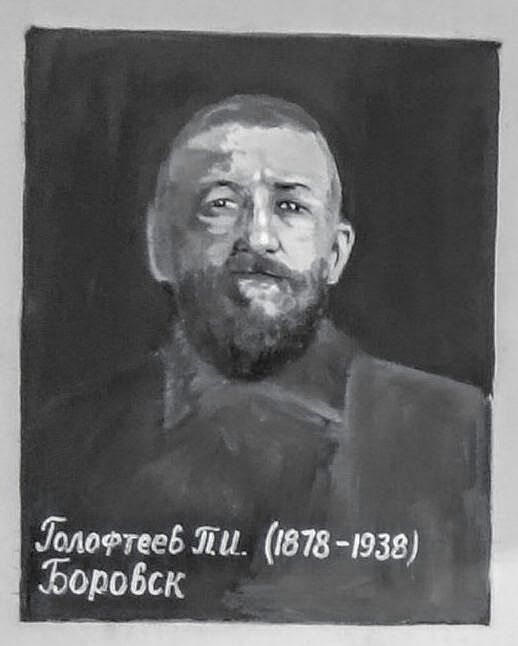
Prokofij Golofteev
(1878-1938) - a native and resident of Borovsk.
Shot in 1938

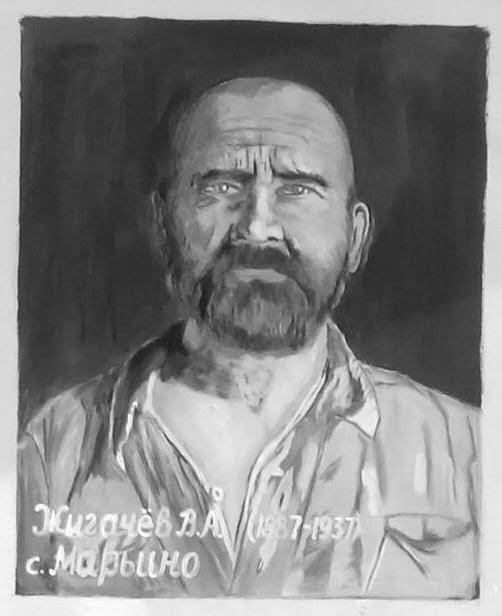
Vasilij Zhigachyov
(1887-1937) - a native and resident of the village Marino.
Shot in 1937

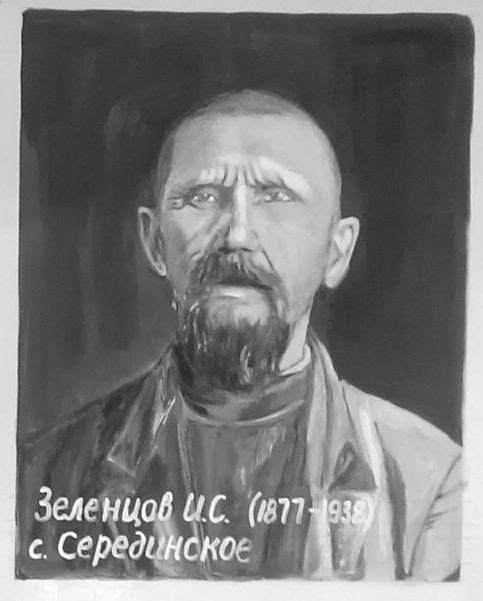
Ivan Zelencov
(1877-1938) - a native and resident of the village Gorki.
Shot in 1938

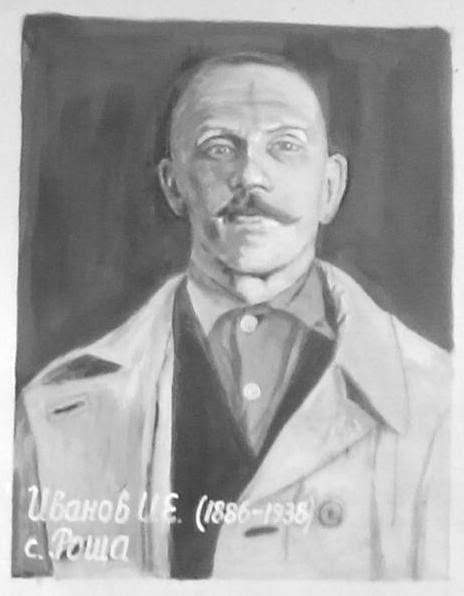
Ivan Ivanov
(1886-1938) - a native of the village Roshcha.
Shot in 1938

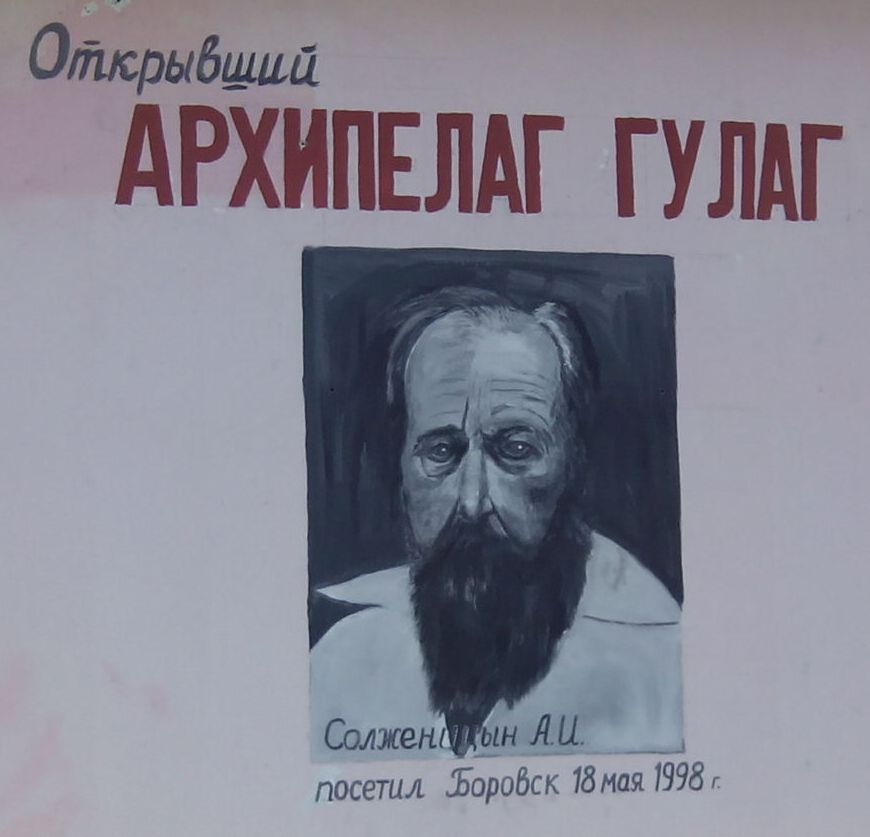
Aleksandr Solzhenitsyn
(1918-2008)

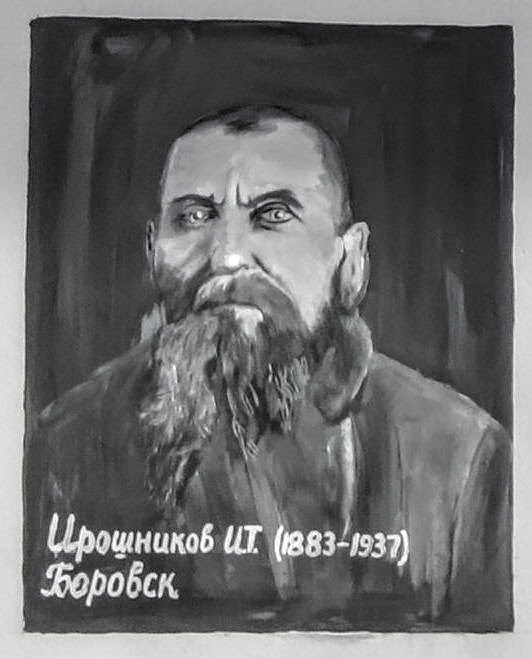
Ipat Iroshnikov
(1883-1937) - a native and resident of Borovsk.
Shot in 1937

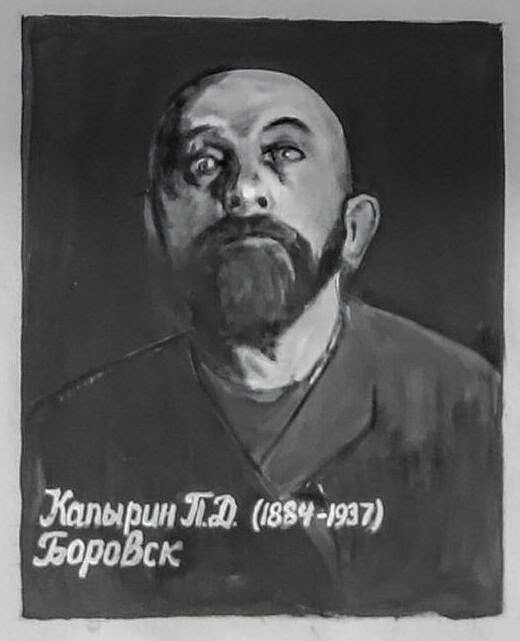
Dmitrij Kapyrin
(1884-1937) - a native and resident of Borovsk.
Shot in 1937

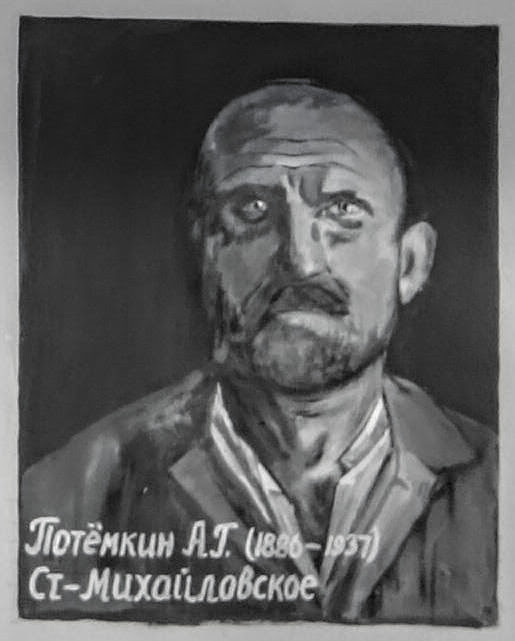
Aleksandr Potyomkin
(1886-1937) - a resident of the village Staromihajlovskoe.
Shot in 1937

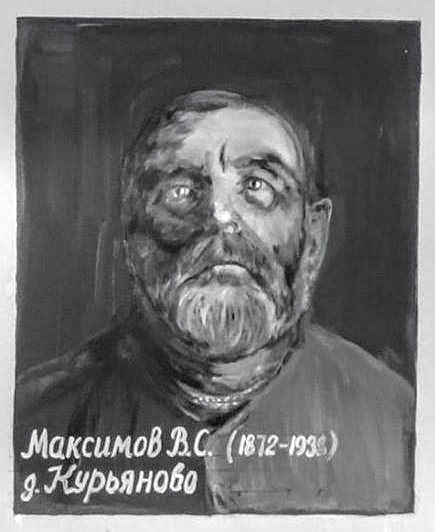
Vasilij Maksimov
(1872-1938) - a native and resident of the village Kuryanovo.
Shot in 1938

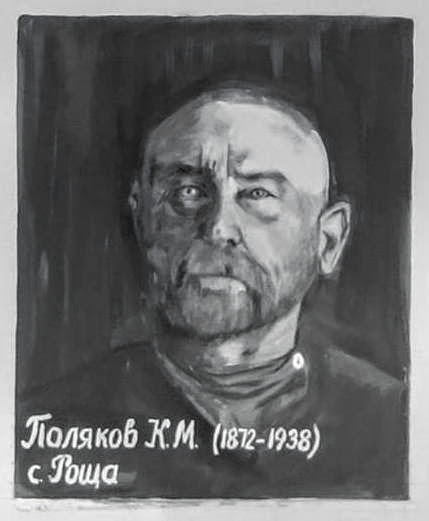
Kuzma Polyakov
(1872-1938)- a native and resident of the village Roshcha.
Shot in 1938

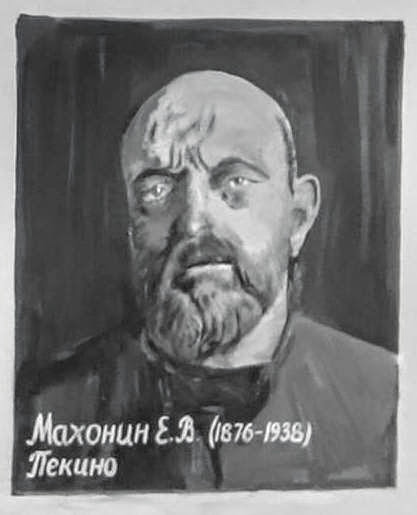
Evdokim Mahonin
(1876-1938) - a native and resident of the village Pekino.
Shot in 1938

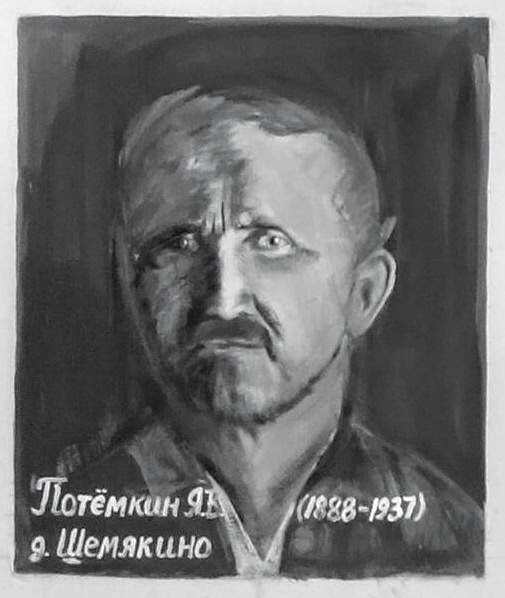
Yakov Potyomkin
(1888-1937) - a native of the village Shemyakino.
Shot in 1937

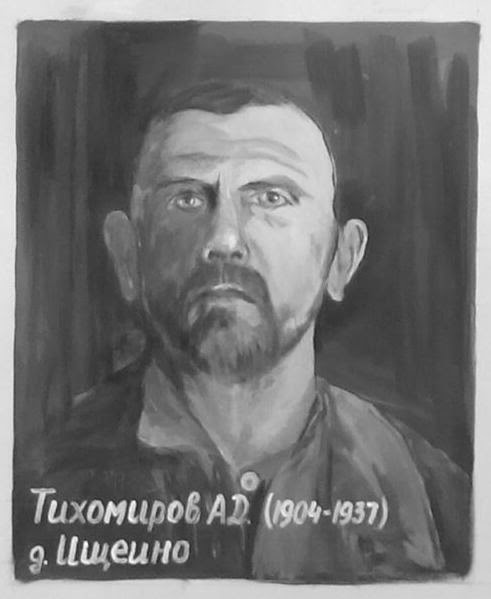
Aleksandr Tihomirov
(1904-1937)- a native and resident of the village Ischeino.
Shot in 1937

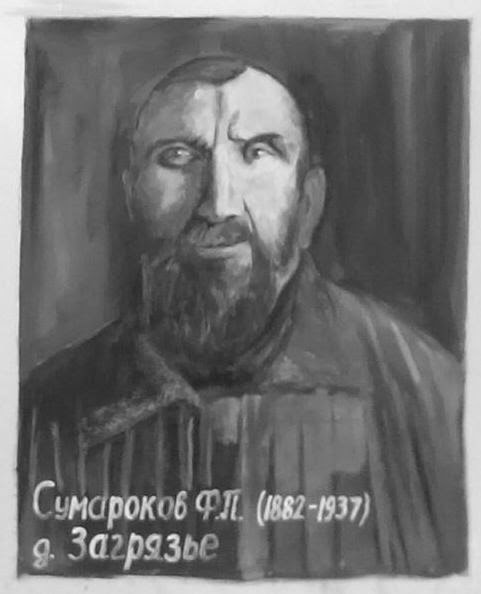
Fyodor Sumarokov
(1882-1937) - a native of the village Zagryaze.
Shot in 1937

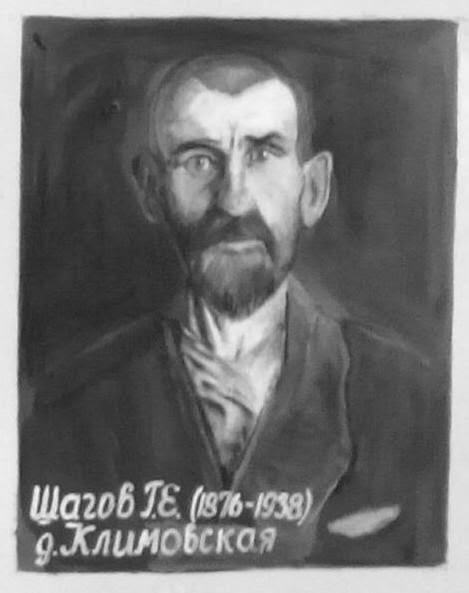
Grigorij Shagov
(1876-1938) - a native and resident of the village Klimovskoe.
Shot in 1938

Ovchinnikov is not only famous for his frescoes, which for many years have adorned the walls of houses in Borovsk, but for what was his driving desire to install a monument in the city of the repressed:

It began from the sceneries… Then I understood that I need a theme. And this theme was history…

For fifteen years the artist collected materials for the gallery of the repressed people. In August, this monument finally appeared: 18 portraits of the repressed, which the artist has painted... on the fence of his neighbor. But another attempt to create a memorial gallery was smashed by the actions of hooligans and vandals. On the wall of one of the shops in the center of Borovsk, a painting of 20 killed people and the image of Alexander Solzhenitsyn was destroyed after only two days. Ovchinnikov's work was destroyed methodically and carefully.

== Literature ==
- Vladimir Ovchinnikov, Vitaly Chernikov. Borovsk in Painting and Poetry: The Exhibition Catalog. — Moscow: Gallery-Museum Nikor, 2002. — 28 p.: ill. (in Russian)
- Vladimir Ovchinnikov, Vitaly Chernikov. Borovsk in Painting and Poetry: Art and Poetry Album. — Kaluga: Golden Alley, 2003. — 192 p.: ill. — (in Russian)
- Parallel town Vladimir Ovchinnikov and Elvira Chastikova: Art and poetry album. — Obninsk: Printer, 2005. — 48 p .: ill. (in Russian)
- Dmitry Anokhin. Murals Ovchinnikov engineer. Moscow Construction Decorate Borovsk // Vechernyaya Moskva. — No. 166 (24944). — 11 September 2008.
- Oksana Prilepina. City one Artist // Russkij Mir. — 2010. — No. 2. (in Russian)
- Anastasia Fyodorova. Why Parallel City Can Sink Into Oblivion // MK Kaluga. — 16 November 2007. (in Russian)
- Elena Tsygankova. Faces Magazine. Vladimir Ovchinnikov // Faces Magazine 2007, September. (in Russian)
