= Borovsk =

Borovsk Боровск
- Town
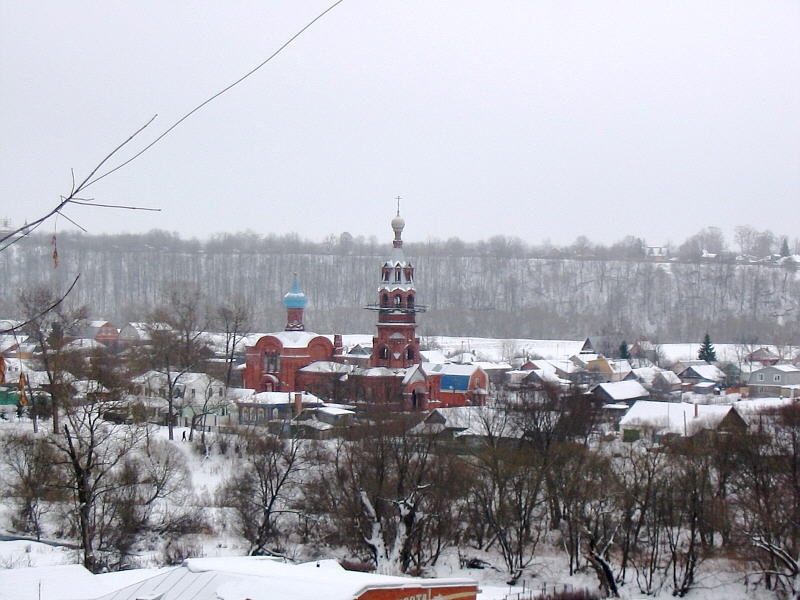
- View of Borovsk

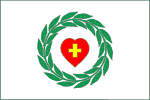
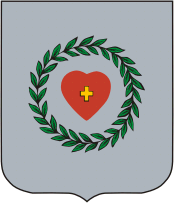
- Flag Coat of arms
- Interactive map of Borovsk
- Location of Borovsk Borovsk (Kaluga Oblast)
- Coordinates: 55°12′N 36°30′E
- Country: Russia
- Federal subject: Kaluga Oblast
- Administrative district: Borovsky District
- Founded: 1356

Government
  - Head: Mikhail Klimov (acting)
- Elevation: 166 m (545 ft)

Population (2010 Census)
  - Total: 12,283
  - Estimate (2023): 12,686 (+3.3%)

Administrative status
  - Capital of: Borovsky District

Municipal status
  - Municipal district: Borovsky Municipal District
  - Urban settlement: Borovsk Urban Settlement
  - Capital of: Borovsky Municipal District, Borovsk Urban Settlement
- Time zone: UTC+3 (MSK)
- Postal code: 249010
- Dialing code: +7 48438
- OKTMO ID: 29606101001
- Website: www.borovsk.org

Borovsk (Russian: Бо́ровск) is a town and the administrative center of Borovsky District of Kaluga Oblast, Russia, located on the Protva River just south from the oblast's border with Moscow Oblast. Population: 12,598 (2021 census); 12,283 (2010 census); 11,917 (2002 census); 13,405 (1989 Soviet census). 12,000 (1969).

== History ==
It is known to have existed since 1356 as a part of the Principality of Ryazan. In the 14th century, it was owned by Vladimir the Bold, but passed to the Grand Duchy of Moscow when his granddaughter Maria of Borovsk married Vasily II.

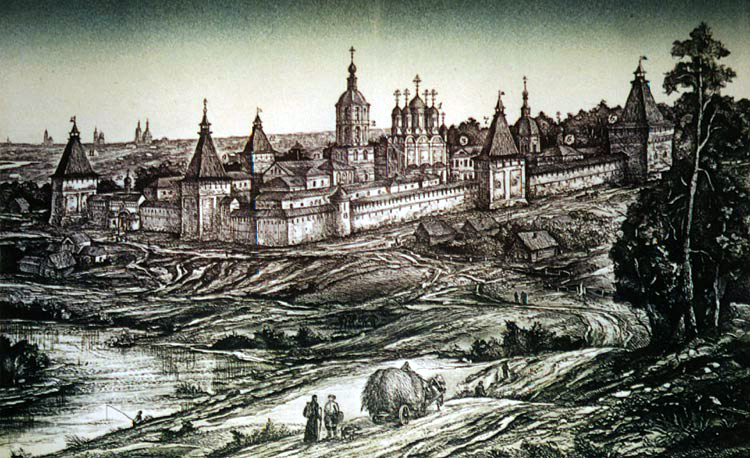
Borovsk Monastery of St. Paphnutius

In 1444, the St. Paphnutius Monastery was founded near Borovsk. Its strong walls, towers, and a massive cathedral survive from the reign of Boris Godunov. Two famous Old Believers—archpriest Avvakum Petrovich and boyarynya Feodosiya Morozova—were incarcerated at this monastery in the second half of the 17th century. The town was liberated by the Red Army on January 4, 1942.

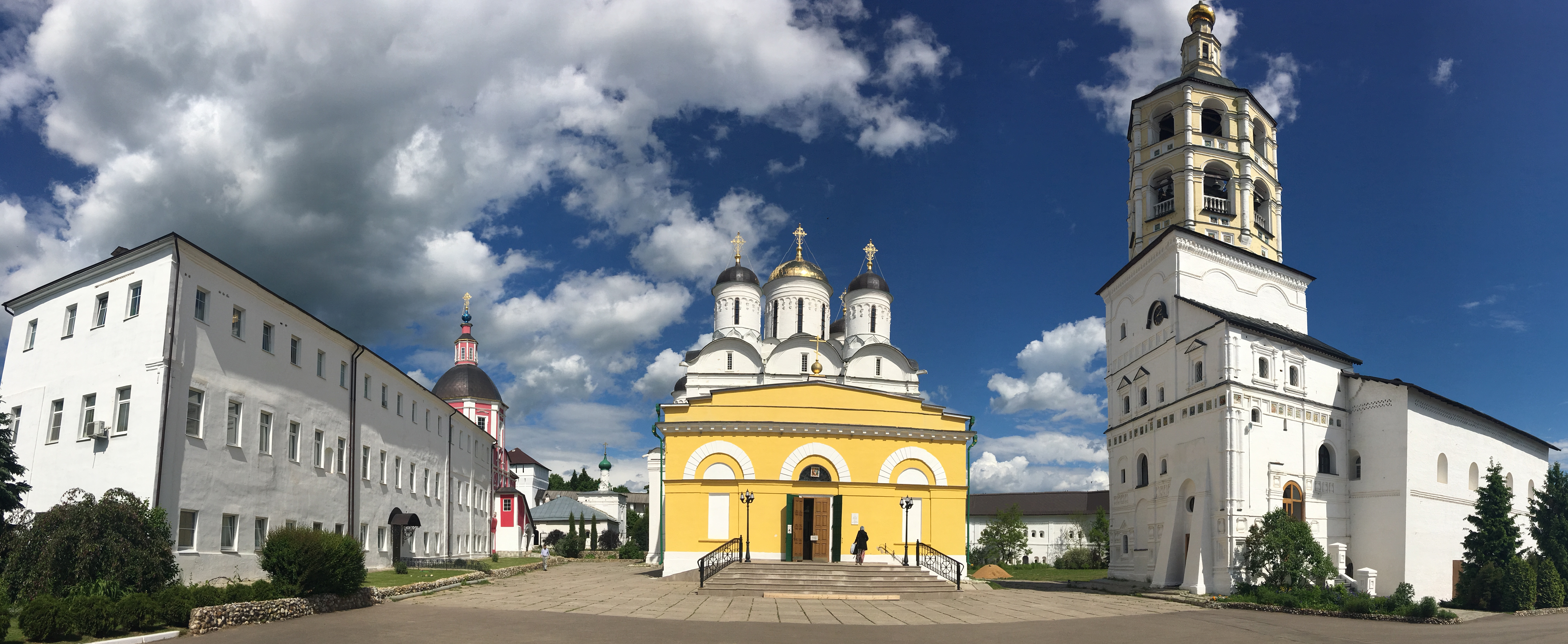
The Monastery today

== Administrative and municipal status ==
Within the framework of administrative divisions, Borovsk serves as the administrative center of Borovsky District, to which it is directly subordinated. As a municipal division, the town of Borovsk is incorporated within Borovsky Municipal District as Borovsk Urban Settlement.

== Culture ==
Among the monuments of Borovsk are the oldest wooden church in the region (the 17th century) and a museum of Konstantin Tsiolkovsky, who lived and worked there as a teacher in 1880–1891. Borovsk has recently been known for painted façades of its down-town buildings, resulting from a work of one local painter.

== Sights ==
- Pafnutyevo-Borovsky monastery, an ensemble of architectural monuments of the 16th-17th centuries.
- Church of the Intercession of the Holy Virgin
- Apartment Museum Konstantin Tsiolkovsky
- Gallery of wall paintings created by self-taught artist Vladimir Ovchinnikov
- Monument to Konstantin Tsiolkovsky
- Chapel-monument to the alleged place of detention and the death of Boyar Morozova
