= Yuri Kondratyuk =

Soviet engineer and mathematician (1897–1942)

- Юрий Кондратюк (Russian); Юрій Кондратюк (Ukrainian)
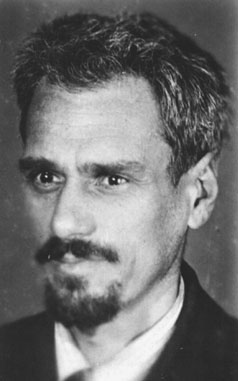
- Kondratyuk in 1941
- Born: Aleksandr Ignatyevich Shargei; 21 June 1897; Poltava, Poltava Governorate, Russian Empire (now Ukraine)
- Died: February 1942 (aged 44) near Kaluga, Kaluga Region, Russian SFSR, Soviet Union
- Cause of death: Killed in action
- Education: SPbPU
- Occupations: Rocket scientist, engineer
- Parents: Ignat Benediktovich Shargei (father); Ludmila Lvovna Schlippenbach (mother)
- Military career
- Allegiance: Russian Empire (1916–1918), Soviet Union (1941–1942)
- Branch: Imperial Russian Army (1916—1918); Red Army (1941–1942)
- Service years: 1916–1918, 1941–1942
- Conflicts: World War I; World War II

Yuri Vasilyevich Kondratyuk (Russian: Юрий Васильевич Кондратюк; Ukrainian: Юрій Васильович Кондратюк), real name Aleksandr Ignatyevich Shargei (Note: In this name that follows East Slavic naming customs, the patronymic is Ignatyevich and the family name is Shargei.) (Russian: Александр Игнатьевич Шаргей; Ukrainian: Олександр Гнатович Шаргей; 21 June 1897 – February 1942), was a Soviet engineer and mathematician. He was a pioneer of astronautics and spaceflight, a theoretician and a visionary who, in the early 20th century, developed the first known lunar orbit rendezvous (LOR), a key concept for landing and return spaceflight from Earth to the Moon. The LOR was later used for the plotting of the first actual human spaceflight to the Moon. Many other aspects of spaceflight and space exploration are covered in his works.

Kondratyuk made his scientific discoveries in circumstances of war (including both World Wars and the Russian Civil War), continuous persecutions from authorities and serious illnesses. In fact, "Yuri Kondratyuk", the name under which he became known both in Russia and abroad, was a stolen identity he assumed in 1921 for his own protection.

== Biography and research ==
=== Early life ===
Kondratyuk was born as Aleksandr Ignatyevich Shargei in 1897 in Poltava, Russian Empire (now Ukraine), although his family originally lived in Kiev. His father, Ignat Benediktovich Shargei, was a Jewish convert to Catholicism who studied physics and mathematics at St. Vladimir Imperial University of Kiev at the time of his marriage. Kondratyuk's mother, Lyudmila Lvovna Schlippenbach, of the Schlippenbach noble family, taught French at a Kiev school, and must have already been pregnant when she married in January 1897. She is a direct descendant of Wolmar Anton von Schlippenbach, a general who took part in Charles XII of Sweden's failed invasion of Russia. Her grandfather Anton von Schlippenbach was lieutenant colonel of the Imperial Russian Army and participated in the Napoleonic Wars. Aleksandr lived mostly with his grandmother and her husband in Poltava.

From an early age, Kondratyuk demonstrated great abilities in physics and mathematics. When he was old enough to attend high school, he was admitted straight into the third form of a prestigious high school, where he graduated with a gold medal for proficiency a few years later.

=== Higher education and World War I ===
Kondratyuk later enrolled at the Peter the Great Petrograd Imperial Polytechnic Institute to study engineering, where he was influenced by Ivan Meshcherskiy. Soon, however, he was drafted to serve in World War I, and was sent to ensign training at one of the local Petrograd junker schools. During his military service on the Caucasian Front, Kondratyuk filled four notebooks with his ideas of interplanetary flight. These included suggesting the use of a modular spacecraft to reach the Moon, leaving the propulsion section of the vehicle on orbit while a smaller lander journeyed to the surface and back (the strategy eventually adopted by the engineers of the Apollo program). He included detailed calculations of the trajectory to take a spacecraft from Earth orbit to lunar orbit and back to Earth orbit, a trajectory now known as "Kondratyuk's route" or "Kondratyuk's loop".

=== First Soviet years ===
Kondratyuk left the army in 1917 following the Russian Revolution and tried to make a living stoking boilers back in Poltava. Being a former officer of the Tsarist army, he was once again mobilised in 1919 to join the White Army. Not wishing to participate in the civil war, he deserted during the journey from Kiev to Odessa, losing all his documents in the process. A deserter to the Whites, he was also at high risk of arrest by Bolshevik authorities as a former tsarist officer.

In 1920 Kondratyuk made an attempt to escape for Poland but was stopped and turned back by border guards. In the meantime, his stepmother obtained the documents of a certain Yuri Vasilyevich Kondratyuk, born in Lutsk in 1900 and recently deceased of tuberculosis. Under this new identity, Kondratyuk lived in and around Kuban and the North Caucasus, working as a mechanic and railroad worker. He settled in Novosibirsk in Siberia in 1927.

=== First book, engineering work and imprisonment ===
Working as a mechanic, Kondratyuk completed the manuscript of a book titled The Conquest of Interplanetary Spaces, dealing with rocket motion and issues concerning the colonization of space. He also suggested using a gravitational slingshot trajectory to accelerate a spacecraft. In 1925, Kondratyuk made contact with Moscow-based scientist Vladimir Vetchinkin and sent him the manuscript. Up to that time, he and his work were unknown to rocketry enthusiasts. While the book was enthusiastically received by scientists in Moscow, no publisher would touch such a fanciful work. Eventually, Kondratyuk paid a Novosibirsk printing shop to produce 2,000 copies of the 72-page work, and even then had to do much of the typesetting and operating the press himself, both to save costs but also because the equations in the book posed problems for the printer. Kondratyuk's discoveries were made independently of Konstantin Tsiolkovsky who also worked on spaceflight issues at that time; the two never met.

Applying his engineering skill to local problems, Kondratyuk designed a huge 13,000 ton grain elevator (quickly nicknamed "Mastodon") in Kamen-na-Obi, built of wood without a single nail, since metal was in short supply in Siberia. This ingenuity would work against him when in 1930 he was investigated as a "saboteur" by the NKVD. The lack of nails in the structure was used as evidence that he had planned it to collapse. Convicted of "anti-Soviet activity", Kondratyuk was sentenced to three years in a gulag, but because of his evident talents was sent to a sharashka (research facility prison) rather than a labour camp. There, he was first put to work evaluating foreign coal mining machinery for the use in Kuzbass, and quickly impressed the camp supervisor with his ingenuity. At the supervisor's request, in November 1931 a review board changed Kondratyuk's status from "prisoner" to "exiled", and sent him to work on Siberian grain projects. There he even managed to get a patent and author's certificate in the field of mining equipment.

=== Post-imprisonment research on wind power ===
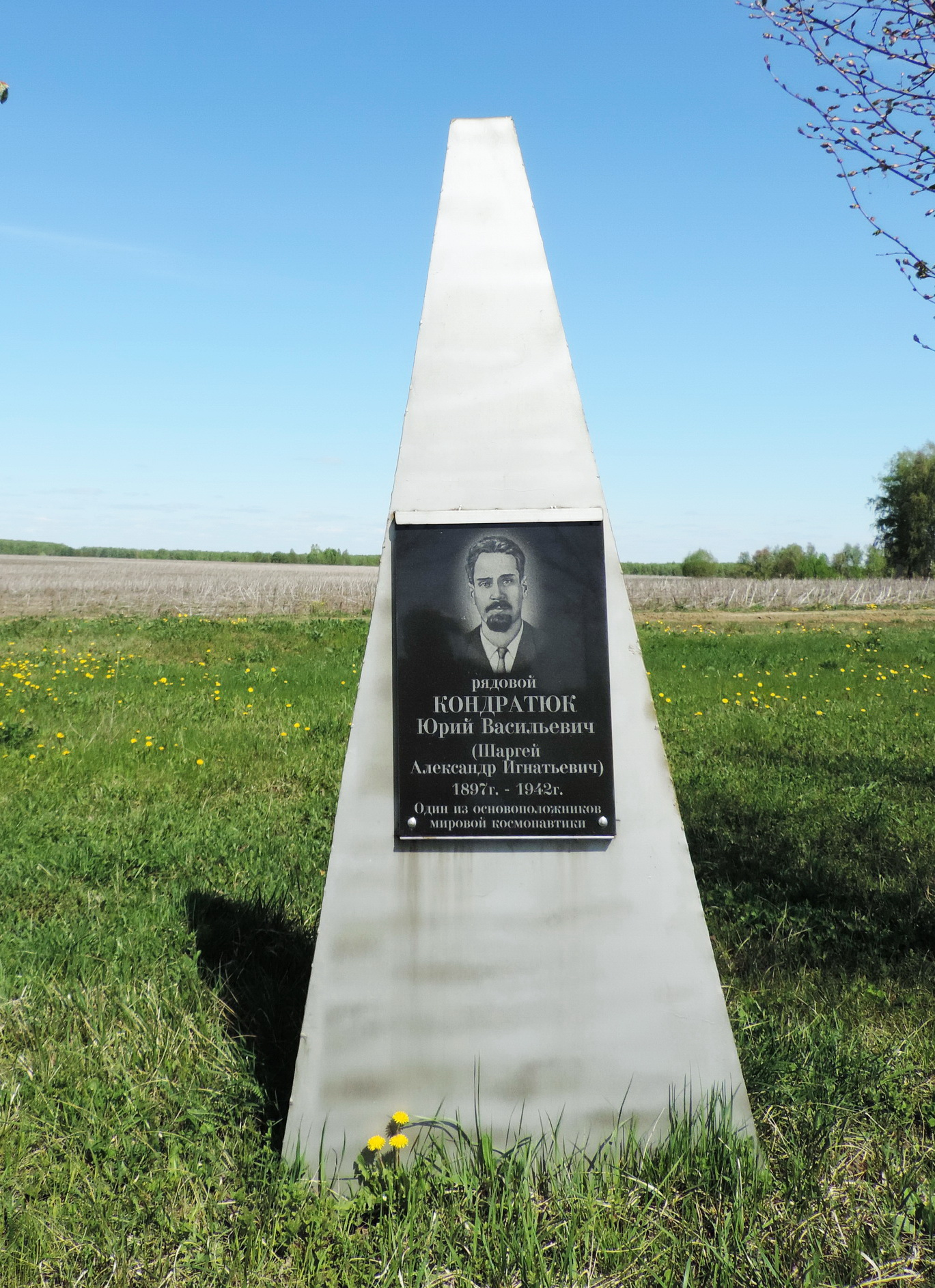
Kondratyuk's monument at the site of his alleged burial in Bolkhovsky

Kondratyuk learned of a competition to design a large wind power generator for Crimea, sponsored by Sergo Ordzhonikidze, then People's Commissar of Heavy Industry. With fellow exiled engineers Pyotr Gorchakov and Nikolai Nikitin, Kondratyuk submitted a design for a 165-metre (500 ft) high concrete tower supporting a four-bladed propeller with a span of 80 metres (240 ft) and capable of generating up to 12,000 kW. In November 1932, Ordzhonikidze selected this design as the winner and invited the team to meet with him in Moscow before sending them to Kharkov to finalise the design and supervise its construction. While in Moscow, Kondratyuk had the opportunity to meet Sergei Korolev, then head of the Group for the Study of Reactive Motion (GIRD), the Soviet rocket research group). Korolev offered Kondratyuk a position on his staff, but Kondratyuk declined, fearing that the scrutiny he would come under the NKVD would reveal his true identity.

Kondratyuk, Gorchakov, and Nikitin worked on the wind power project for the next four years until Ordzhonikidze's mysterious death in 1937. Overnight, the project was deemed to be too expensive and dangerous and was shut down, the tower only half-built. Nikitin would later use what he had learned on this project when he designed the Ostankino Tower in the 1960s. Meanwhile, the men went to work on designing smaller wind turbines (in the 150-200 kW range) to power farms. During this time, Kondratyuk learned of the arrest of Korolev on charges of treason for wasting time on designing spacecraft.

He immediately decided to divest himself of his own copious notes on the subject. The former neighbour in Novosibirsk who had nursed him back to health after his episode of typhus agreed to take his notebooks and eventually took these to the United States when she escaped there with her daughter following World War II. He also sent a copy of his published work to the Tsiolkovsky State Museum of the History of Cosmonautics in Kaluga.

=== World War II fighting and death ===
Kondratyuk joined the Red Army as a volunteer in June 1941 and died in 1942 near Kaluga. The exact circumstances of his death are not known. His unit was involved in heavy fighting against the Nazis in October 1941, and 3 October is sometimes given as the date of his demise. Evidence collected in the 1990s suggests that he disappeared in January or February 1942 while repairing a communications cable at night near Zasetsky, a village in the Kirovsky District of the Kaluga region.

== Selected works ==
- To those who would read when building (a spacecraft) - 1919 (unpublished)
- Conquest of Interplanetary Space - 1925

== Remembrance and tributes ==
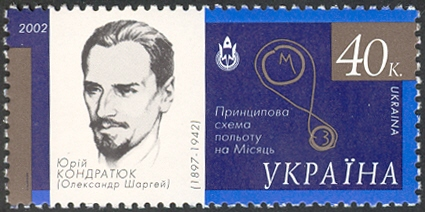
A 2002 Ukrainian postage stamp commemorating Kondratyuk.

When American astronaut Neil Armstrong visited the Soviet Union after his historic flight to the Moon, he collected a handful of soil from outside Kondratyuk's house in Novosibirsk to acknowledge his contribution to spaceflight, reportedly urging Soviet authorities to start commemorating Kondratyuk.

Later, a science centre and college in Novosibirsk was named after Kondratyuk, as well as streets in Poltava, Kyiv, and Moscow. The Poltava National Technical University has borne Kondratyuk's name since 1997. Additionally, Kondratyuk was the namesake of the Kondratyuk crater on the Moon and the 3084 Kondratyuk minor planet discovered in 1977.

The Government of Ukraine has issued postage stamps and coins featuring Kondratyuk.

Yuri Kondratyuk was inducted into the International Space Hall of Fame in 2014.

Kondratyuk's story and contributions to spaceflight were highlighted in the eighth episode of the 2020 American science documentary TV series Cosmos: Possible Worlds, titled "The Sacrifice of Cassini".

== See also ==
- Science and technology in the Soviet Union
- Suppressed research in the Soviet Union
