= The Conquest of Interplanetary Spaces =

Early book about space travel

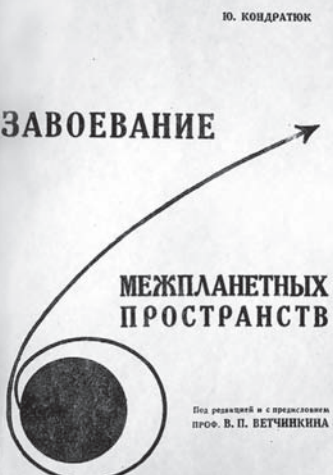
- Author: Yuri Kondratyuk
- Language: Russian
- Subject: Astronautics
- Publisher: Siberian Union
- Publication date: 1929
- Publication place: Soviet Union
- Pages: 72

The Conquest of Interplanetary Spaces is a science book by Soviet engineer and mathematician Yuri Kondratyuk published in 1929, significant for being one of the first documented proposals for lunar orbit rendezvous.

== History ==
While working as a mechanic, Yuri Kondratyuk completed the manuscript of a book titled The Conquest of Interplanetary Spaces, dealing with rocket motion and issues concerning the colonization of space. He also suggested using a gravitational slingshot trajectory to accelerate a spacecraft. In 1925, Kondratyuk made contact with Moscow-based scientist Vladimir Vetchinkin and sent him the manuscript. Up to that time, he and his work were unknown to rocketry enthusiasts. While the book was enthusiastically received by scientists in Moscow, no publisher would touch such a fanciful work.

Eventually, Kondratyuk paid a Novosibirsk Siberian Union printing shop to produce 2,000 copies of the 72-page work, and even then had to do much of the typesetting and operating the press himself, both to save costs but also because the equations in the book posed problems for the printer. Kondratyuk's discoveries were made independently of Konstantin Tsiolkovsky who also worked on spaceflight issues at that time; the two never met.
