= Meshcherskiy (crater) =

Lunar impact crater

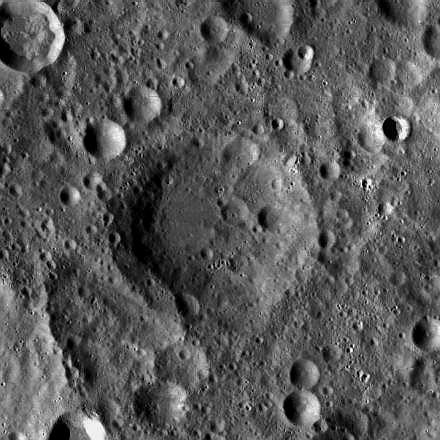
- LRO image
- Coordinates: 12.2°N 125.5°E
- Diameter: 65 km
- Colongitude: 235° at sunrise
- Eponym: Ivan V. Meshcherskiy

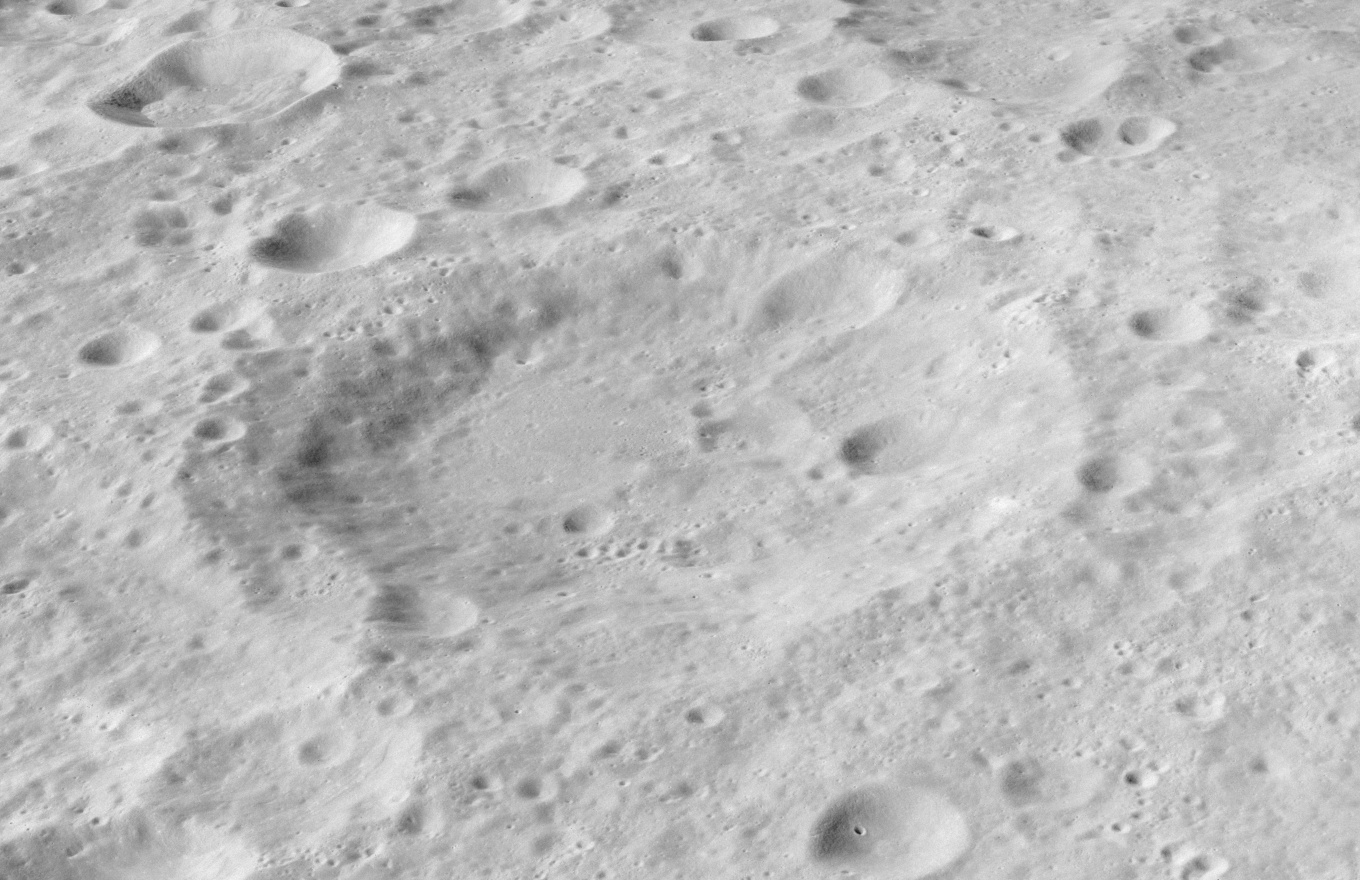
Oblique Apollo 16 image

Meshcherskiy is an impact crater that is located on the Moon's far side, to the east-northeast of the larger Ostwald. To the east-southeast of Meshchersky is the crater Vetchinkin.

This is a moderately worn crater formation, with some erosion along the south and northeast. The interior floor has an area of low-albedo surface in its southern part. The remainder of the floor is more irregular in the eastern half.

The crater is named after the Russian mathematician Ivan Vsevolodovich Meshcherskiy. Prior to naming in 1970 by the IAU, this crater was known as Crater 214.

== Satellite craters ==
By convention these features are identified on lunar maps by placing the letter on the side of the crater midpoint that is closest to Meshcherskiy.

Meshcherskiy	Latitude	Longitude	Diameter
K	9.6° N	126.8° E	17 km
X	16.0° N	124.2° E	39 km
