= Alexey Akindinov =

Russian painter (born 1977)

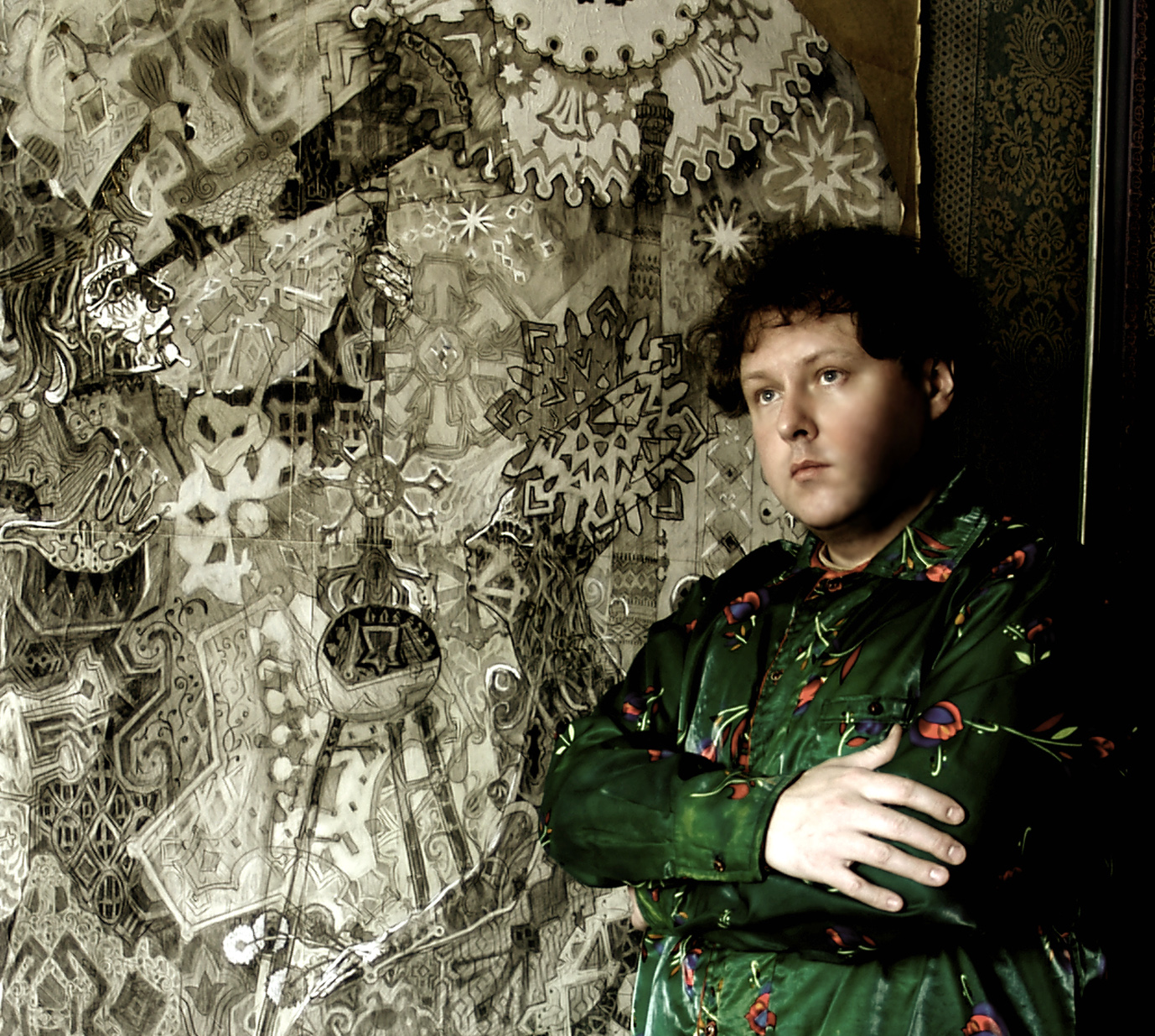
Artist Alex Akindinov

Alexey Petrovich Akindinov Russian: Алексей Петрович Акиндинов (January 6, 1977) is a Russian artist and a founder of Ornamentalism in the 1996. He spent all of his life in Ryazan.

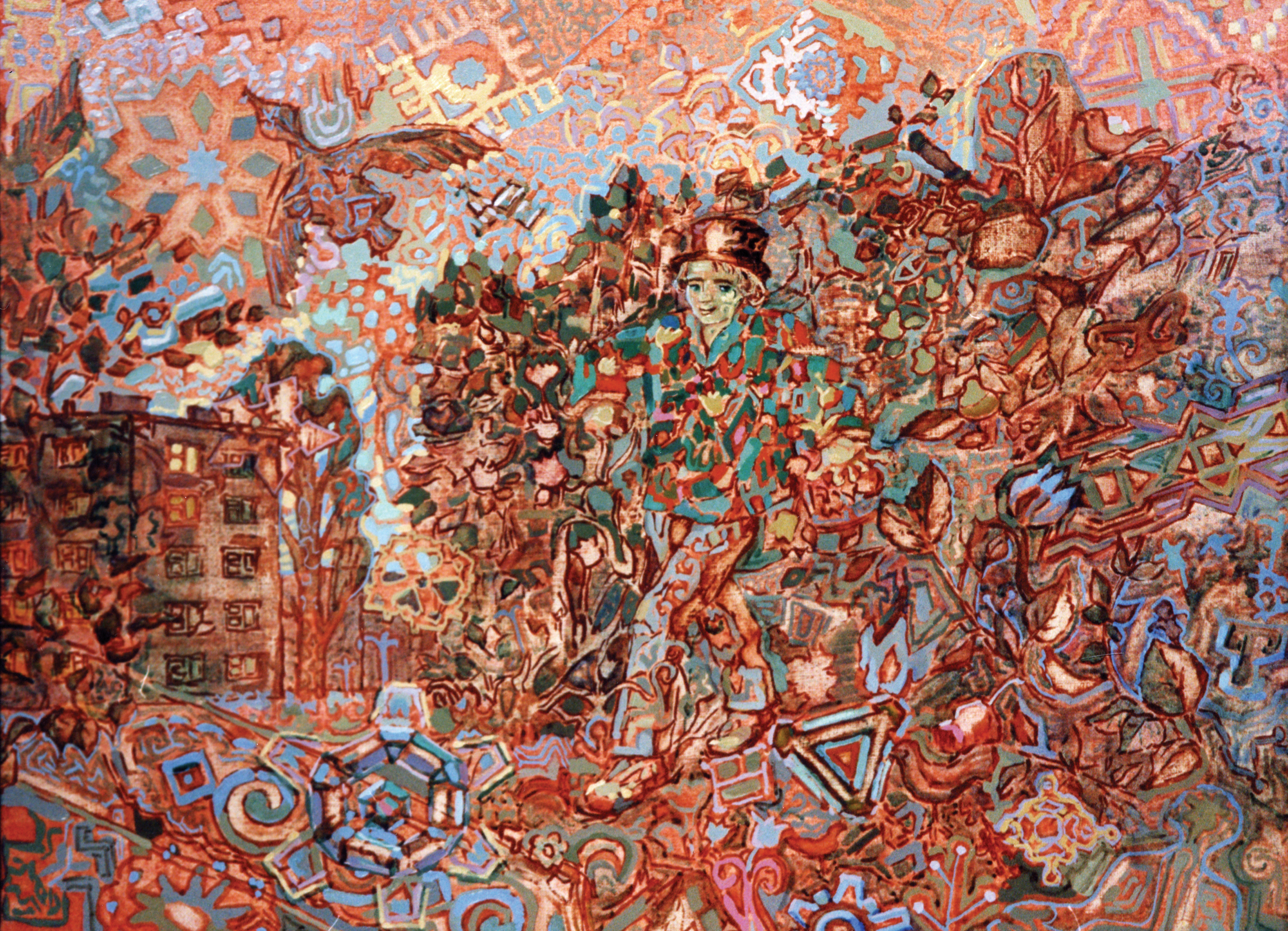
Alexey Akindinov. Yesenin's Morning. 1998

In 1996, Alexey Akindinov created a new style in the visual arts: Ornamentalism. The artist's creative experience is 36 years (the first exhibition "I paint the World", is the Exhibition Hall of the Union of Artists of Russia, Ryazan, 1989); participated in 188 exhibitions, including 11 All—Russian exhibitions organized by the Union of Artists of Russia, the Russian Academy of Arts and the Ministry of Culture of the Russian Federation, 24 personal exhibitions; The Union of Artists of Russia is 25 years old; 20 foreign articles have been published, more than 60 television programs (news stories, interviews, live broadcasts, teleconferences), including two stories on the Federal TV Channel Kultura; paintings and graphic works by A. P. Akindinov were used as illustrations and in cover design in more than 30 books. At the moment, there are more than fifty followers of A. P. Akindinov's Ornamentalism from all over the world. In July 2025, a research monograph on the work of A. P. Akindinov was published: Glukhov, A. V. "The Work of A. P. Akindinov and the Foundation of a New Style in Fine Art: ORNAMENTALISM. A Research Monograph on a Unique Russian Artist." — Yekaterinburg: Publishing Solutions, 2025. — 308 p. The work is written in the style of a dissertation research and includes 237 sources and references, with a total volume of 308 pages. The empirical part of the study consists of 11 appendices.

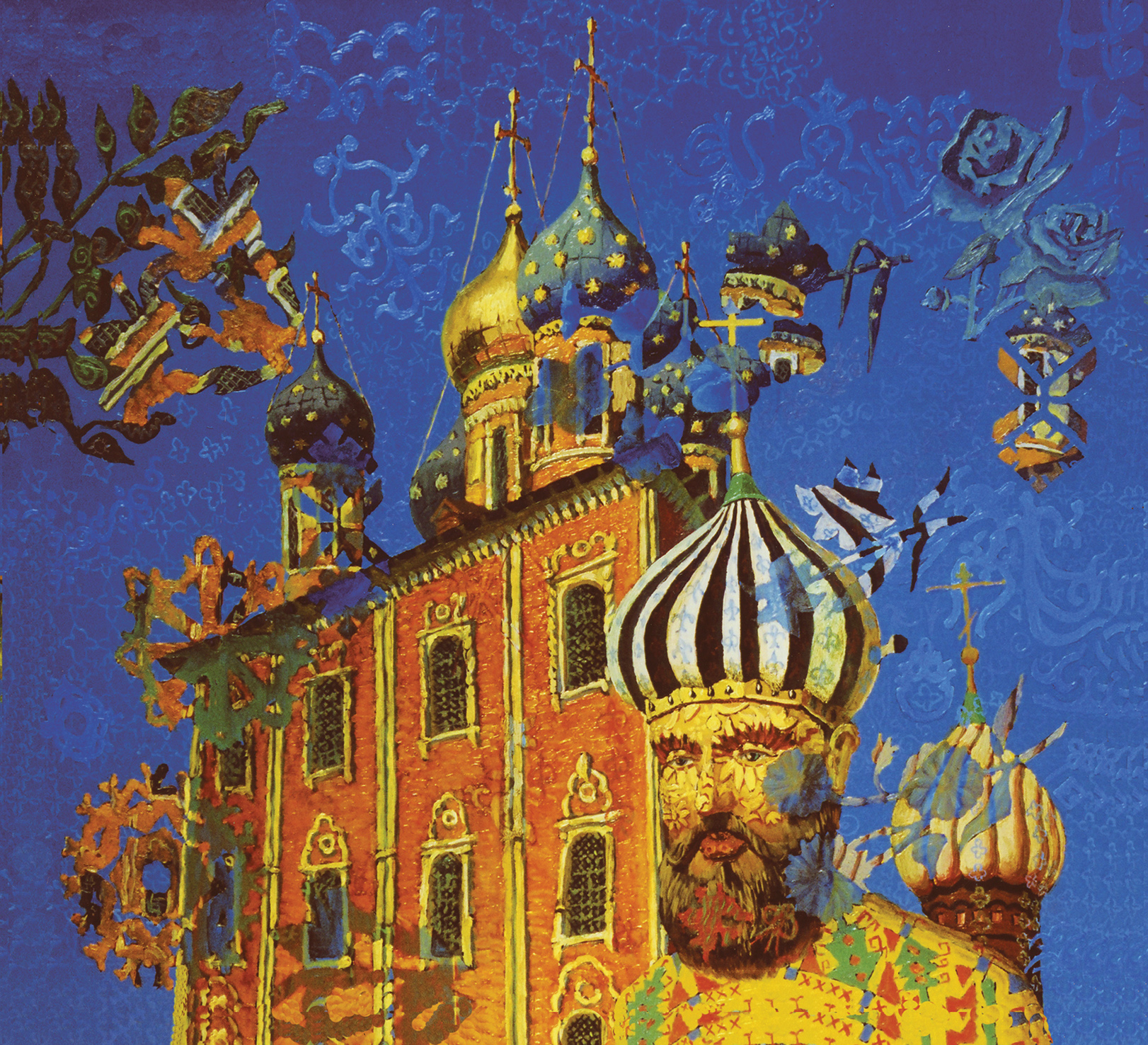
Alexey Akindinov. Gericka - Gerlikaerika. 1997

== Bibliography (selected) ==
- Akindinov A. P. Ornamente // Kunstler aus Rjasan, 5. bis 20 April 2005. — Bezirksregierung Munster, NRW. — P. 4 — 5.
- Arx Katia von. Artikel. ORNAMENTALES VERSTECKSPIEL. Hinter den Zeichen // Zeitschrift «Manuell». — 2025, — №3. — P. 5.
- Bobilevich, Grazhina. On the History of Yesenin Portraits. Sergei Yesenin in the Portraits by the Artist Alexey Akindinov// Modern Yesenin Studies. — 2013. — No. 25. — pp. 3 – 18.
- Bobilewicz G. Ornamentalizm we wspólczesnym malarstwie rosyjskim (teoria i praktyka artystyczna). «Irydion. Literatura. Teatr. Kultura», t. III, nr 1, Częstochowa 2017. S. 79—96.
- Bobilevich Grazhina. Alexey Akindinov, an Ornamentalist Artist // State Exhibition Hall "On Kashirka". "Ornamentism. Terra Incognita" / Catalog. — Moscow: GBUK, 2013. — pp. 6 – 7.
- Glukhov, A. V. Painting and Graphics by Alexey Akindinov. Edited by L. G. Serebryakova. — Yekaterinburg: Publishing Solutions, 2024. — 208
- Curtain’s Up Russian Art Past & Present // Exhibition booklet. TULSA PERFORMING ARTS CENTER, Oct.20 — Nov.19, 2005. — P. 2 -3.
- Curtain’s Up Russian Art Past & Present // INTERMISSION. TULSA PERFORMING ARTS CENTER, oktber 2005, USA. — P. 19.
- Curtain’s Up Russian Art Past & Present // TULSA PEOPLE, december 2005, USA. — P. 54.
- Ivanova, G. P. Meet Alexey Akindinov // Who's Who in Ryazan. — 2003. — No. 6. — pp. 13–15.
- Martolina M. Ya. The entire starry world is with me as in crystal, an ornamental motif in the painting of Alexey Akindinov //Culture of the Ryazan Region. — 2003. — No. 12/1 (13). — P. 6.
- Protopopova I. N. "New Names" — Alexey Akindinov // Gallery 999. — 2002. — No. 1. — pp. 14 – 15.
- Shelyakina V. Yu. The ornamentalism invented by the artist Alexey Akindinov has been recognized at the European scientific level// Ryazan Vedomosti. — No. 77 (4871). — P. 24.
- Chekalina, L. I. "Ornamentism. Terra Incognita" // Gallery of Fine Arts. Illustrated Newspaper. — 2014. — No. 2—3. — pp. 12–13.
- Frolov, V. L. Yevtushenko himself advised me to buy Akindinov's paintings. Komsomolskaya Pravda. — 2005. — No. 157-t/40 (23591-t). — P. 20.
- Serebryakova L. G. POEZO-PAINTING by A. P. Akindinov and E. N. Foygt — a New Trend in Art: The History of the Creation of the Cycle of Books by T. V. Grinberg and A. V. Glukhov // Glukhov A. V., Grinberg T. V. POST SCRIPTUM with Fine Art of Tatiana Grinberg. Edited by L. G. Serebryakova. — Yekaterinburg: Publishing Solutions, 2026. — 616 p.
- Glukhov A. V. "30 Years of Ornamentism: 1996-2026. A Conversation with Alexey Akindinov on Creativity and the Discovery of a New Style in Fine Art". Edited by L. G. Serebryakova.
- The magazine “Russian Gallery — the 21st Century” (2018). — No. 1/2018; Moscow. Article about Alexey Akindinov, “Ornamental‑Virtual Worlds of Alexey Akindinov” — pp. 12–19, colour/illustrations. Author — Oksana Ermolaeva‑Vdovenko (art historian, curator of contemporary art exhibitions, art critic). Volume — 80 pages. Circulation — 5,000 copies. ISSN 2075-0986.
- Serebryakova L. G. — "Ornamentism is the code of the uniqueness of Akindinov’s style": the book “30 Years of Ornamentism: 1996–2026. A Conversation with Alexey Akindinov about Creativity and the Discovery of a New Style in Fine Art.” Author — Alexander V. Glukhov, editor — Lyubov G. Serebryakova. — [n.p.]: Publishing Solutions under the Ridero license, Yekaterinburg, 2026. УДК 7; ББК 37.94; Г 55. ISBN 978-5-0069-9262-7. Volume — 240 pages, colour illustrations, hardcover.

== Selected exhibitions ==
ALL-RUSSIAN EXHIBITIONS

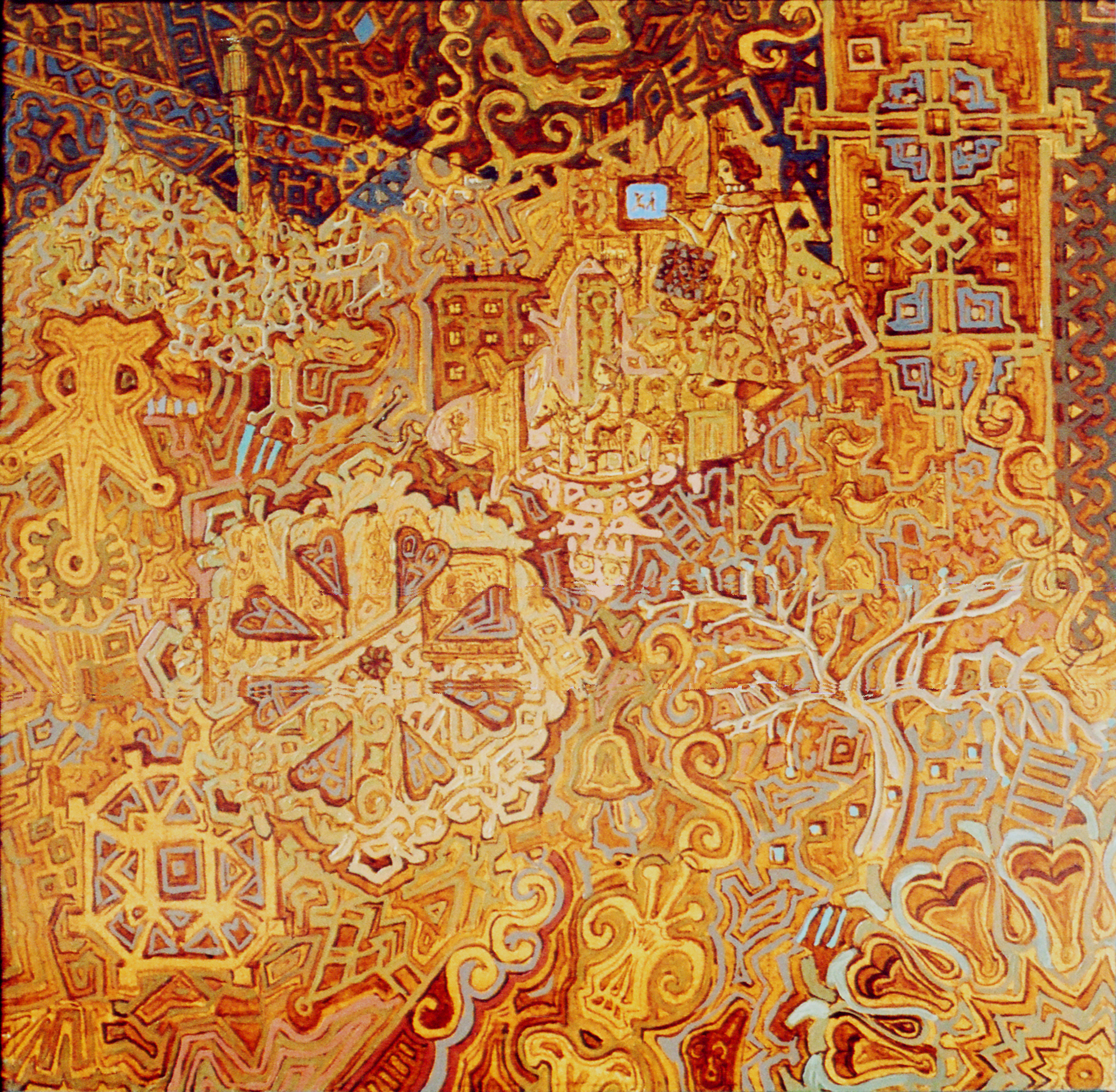
Alexey Akindinov. Tigel's adit. 1998

- 1999 — "Russia — 9", Moscow — Central Exhibition Hall — Manege.
- 2000 — "Revival", Kostroma.
- 2000 — "Boldin Autumn", Moscow — Central House of Artists.
- 2000 — "In the Name of Thy Name", Moscow — Central House of Artists.
- 2003 — "Day of Slavic Writing and St. Mitrofaniy the Wonderworker", Voronezh.
- 2004 — "Glorious Sons of the Fatherland", Moscow — GRDNT.
- 2007 — "Young Artists of Russia" — All-Russian Youth Exhibition dedicated to the 250th Anniversary of the Russian Academy of Arts, Moscow — Central House of Artists.
- 2008 — "Youth of Russia" — Interregional Art Exhibition, Saratov.
- 2010 — All-Russian Youth Exhibition, Moscow — Central House of Artists.
- 2013 — All-Russian Exhibition "O Sport, You Are the World!", dedicated to the World Summer Universiade in Kazan and the Winter Olympic Games in Sochi. Kazan — Contemporary Art Gallery of the State Museum of Fine Arts of the Republic of Tatarstan.
- 2013-2014 — All-Russian exhibition "Sport-Art-Sochi", dedicated to the Winter Olympic Games in Sochi. Venue — Sochi, Sochi Art Museum.
- 2016 — III All-Russian Art Exhibition "Science and Space in the Service of Peace. Tsiolkovsky — Korolev — Gagarin". Smolensk, Tenishev Cultural and Exhibition Center, April 14 — May 10

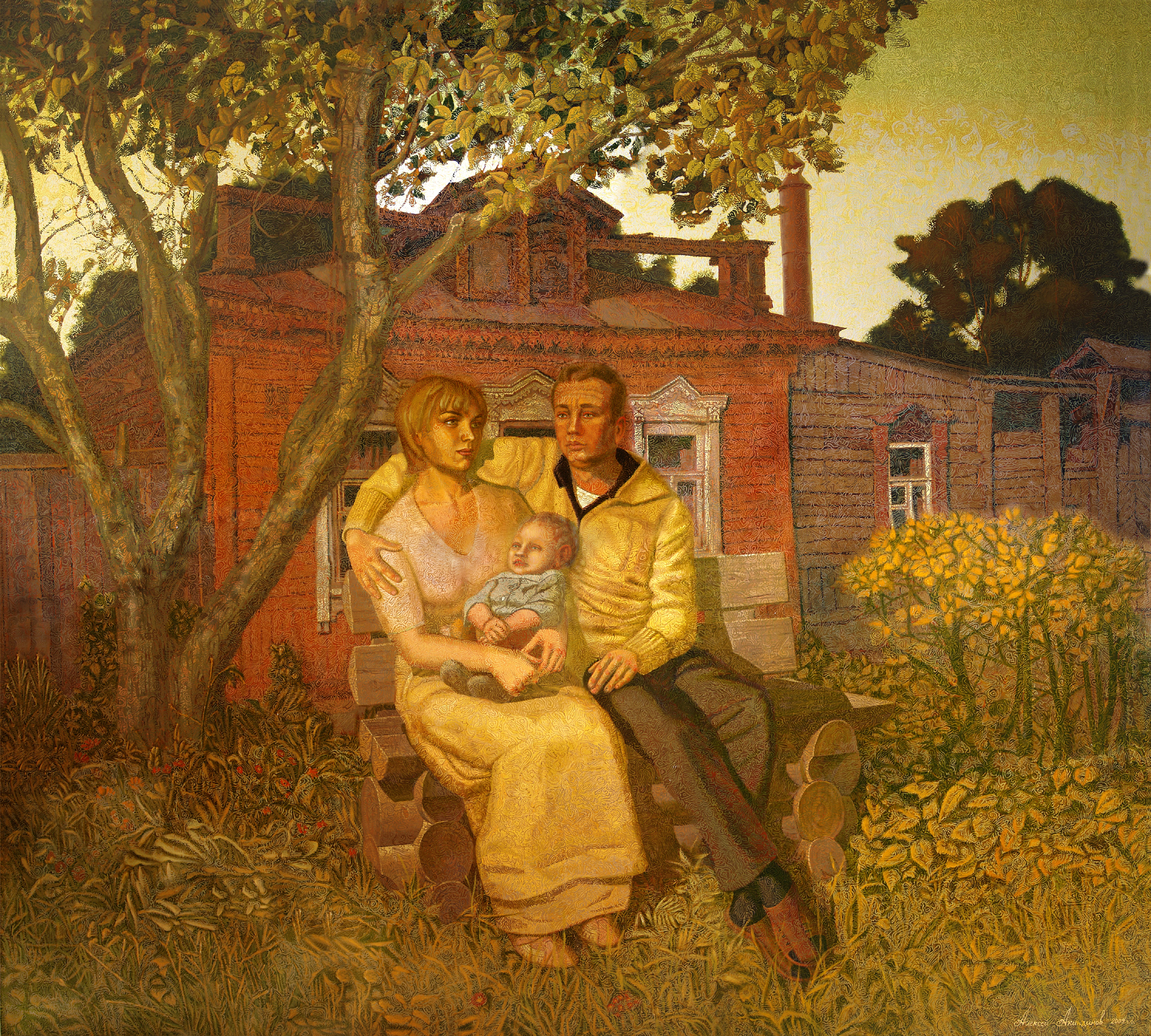
Alexey Akindinov. Motherhood. 2009

FOREIGN EXHIBITIONS

- 2005 (5 — 20 April) — Germany, Münster.
- 2005 (20 October — 19 November) — USA, Oklahoma, Tulsa — «Curtain’s Up. Russian Art Past & Present» — «Curtain to raise. Russian Art — Past and Present». Venue — «Tulsa Performing Arts Center Gallery».
- 2010 (September 15 — October 5) Germany, Berlin. Collective exhibition from the collection of the Russian Gallery of the 21st Century, Russian House of Science and Culture in Berlin.
- 2010 — Collective exhibition "The Black Renaissance", organized by the Union of Artists "Realism of New York", New York, USA.
- 2011 (January 2 — January 16) — New York, USA. International competition exhibition "The International Wave of Fine Arts" ("International Wave in Fine Arts"). Venue: ASA Art Gallery, Herald Center Mall, 3rd Floor, 1293, Broadway, New York, NY 10001.

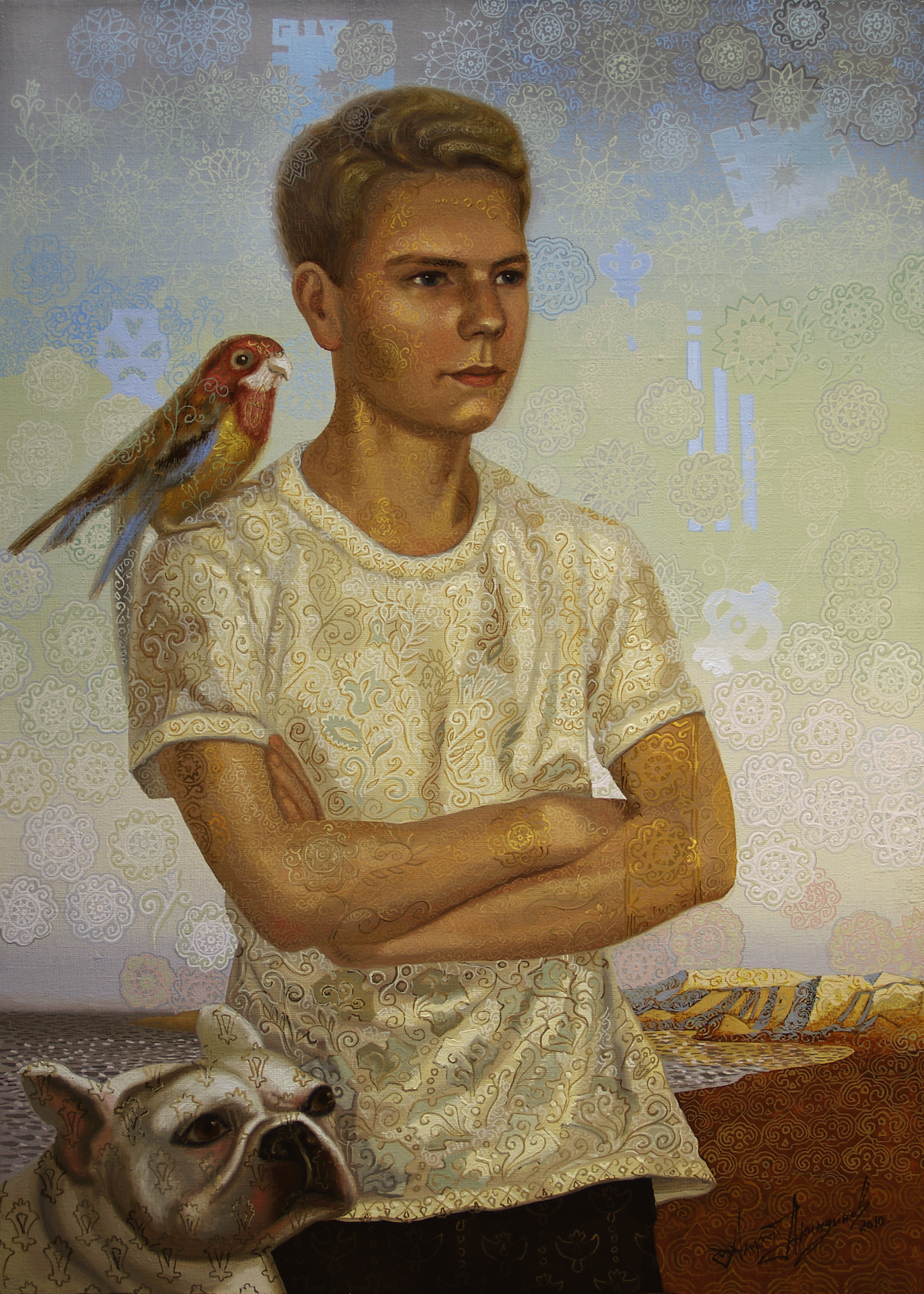
Alexey Akindinov. A portrait of the young man with a dog and a parrot. 2010

PERSONAL EXHIBITIONS

- 1998 — Ryazan Art College named after G. K. Wagner.
- 1999 — Personal exhibition of Alexey Akindinov, Gallery-club at the Regional Youth Library named after Paustovsky.
- 2000 — «All uzorR» — Museum of the history of youth movement, Ryazan.
- 2000—2001 — New Year's personal exhibition of Alexey Akindinov, Bagira Gallery, Moscow.
- 2002 — "THREADS", personal exhibition of Alexey Akindinov, Gallery Club at the Regional Youth Library named after him. Paustovsky.
- 2003 — "The Key" — personal exhibition of Alexey Akindinov, Gallery Club at the Regional Youth Library named after him. Paustovsky.
- 2003 — Gallery "Soyuz — Creativity" — "Memory of childhood", Moscow.
- 2003 — Personal exhibition of Alexey Akindinov. S. A. Esenin State Museum-Reserve in Konstantinovo, Rybnovsky District, Ryazan Region.
- 2003 — Alexey Akindinov's Personal Exhibition, Promregionbank, Ryazan.
- 2003 — Alexey Akindinov's Personal Exhibition, Sasovsky Local History Museum. The exhibition was organized by the Ryazan Department of the Russian Museum of Fine Arts.
- 2004 — Gallery "Soyuz — Tvorchestvo" — "Maria's Keys", Moscow.
- 2004 — Alexey Akindinov's Personal Exhibition — Zhivago-Bank, Ryazan.
- 2004 — Alexey Akindinov's Personal Exhibition, Federal Tax Service, Ryazan.
- 2006 — "Painting of Sleep" — Alexey Akindinov's Personal Exhibition. Ryazan Drama Theatre.
- 2006 — "Ornamentation". Group exhibition. Ryazan Drama Theater.
- 2008 — "The Second Approximation" — An art project by Alexey Akindinov and Willy Melnikov, — reading and decoding of Alexey Akindinov's paintings by the polyglot poet Willy Melnikov. Gallery-club at the Regional Youth Library named after Paustovsky, Ryazan.
- 2009 — Personal exhibition of graphic works by Alexey Akindinov "Points of reference", Gallery-Club at the Regional Youth Library named after him. Paustovsky, Ryazan.
- 2009 — Palitra Art Salon Gallery — Painting by Alexey Akindinov, Ryazan.
- 2010 — Palitra Art Salon Gallery — "Ornamentalism-2010" (collective international exhibition), Ryazan.
- 2010 — Art Salon Palette Gallery — Ornamentism-2010 (collective international exhibition), Ryazan.
- 2013 — Museum of the History of the Youth Movement, Ryazan. Under the Flag of Ornamentism.
- 2016 — Zakharovsky Local History Museum — My Small Homeland, Zakharovo, Ryazan Region.
- 2016 — Exhibition hall of the LMR MO Historical and Art Museum — Uzorochye, Lukhovitsy, Moscow Region.
- 2019 — The first Shik-Raut in Ryazan, Malina shopping center.
- 2023 — Prio-Vneshtorgbank Art Gallery, exhibition "Ornamental Reality", Ryazan.

== Selected works ==
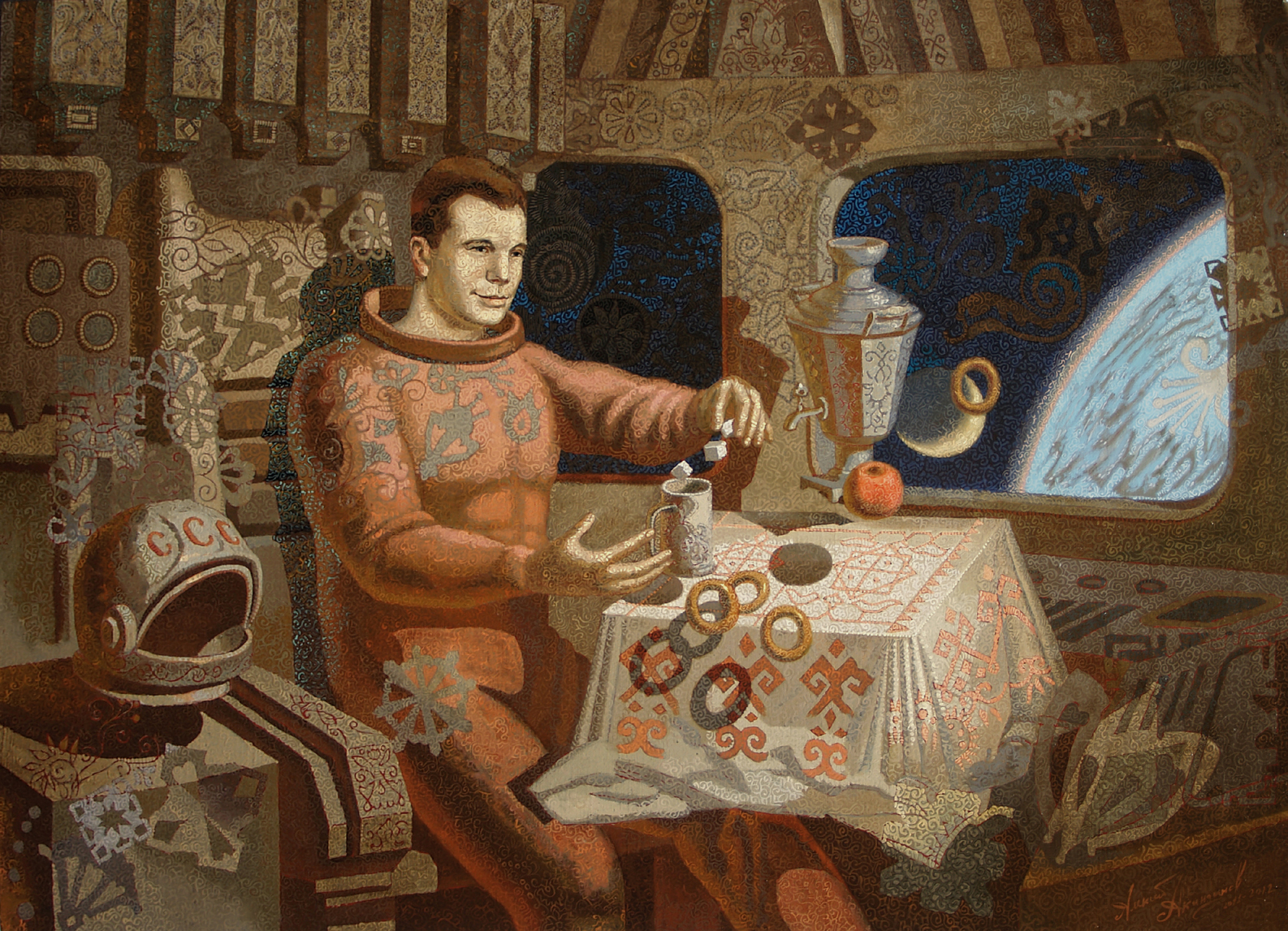
Alexey Akindinov. Gagarin's breakfast. 2011-2012

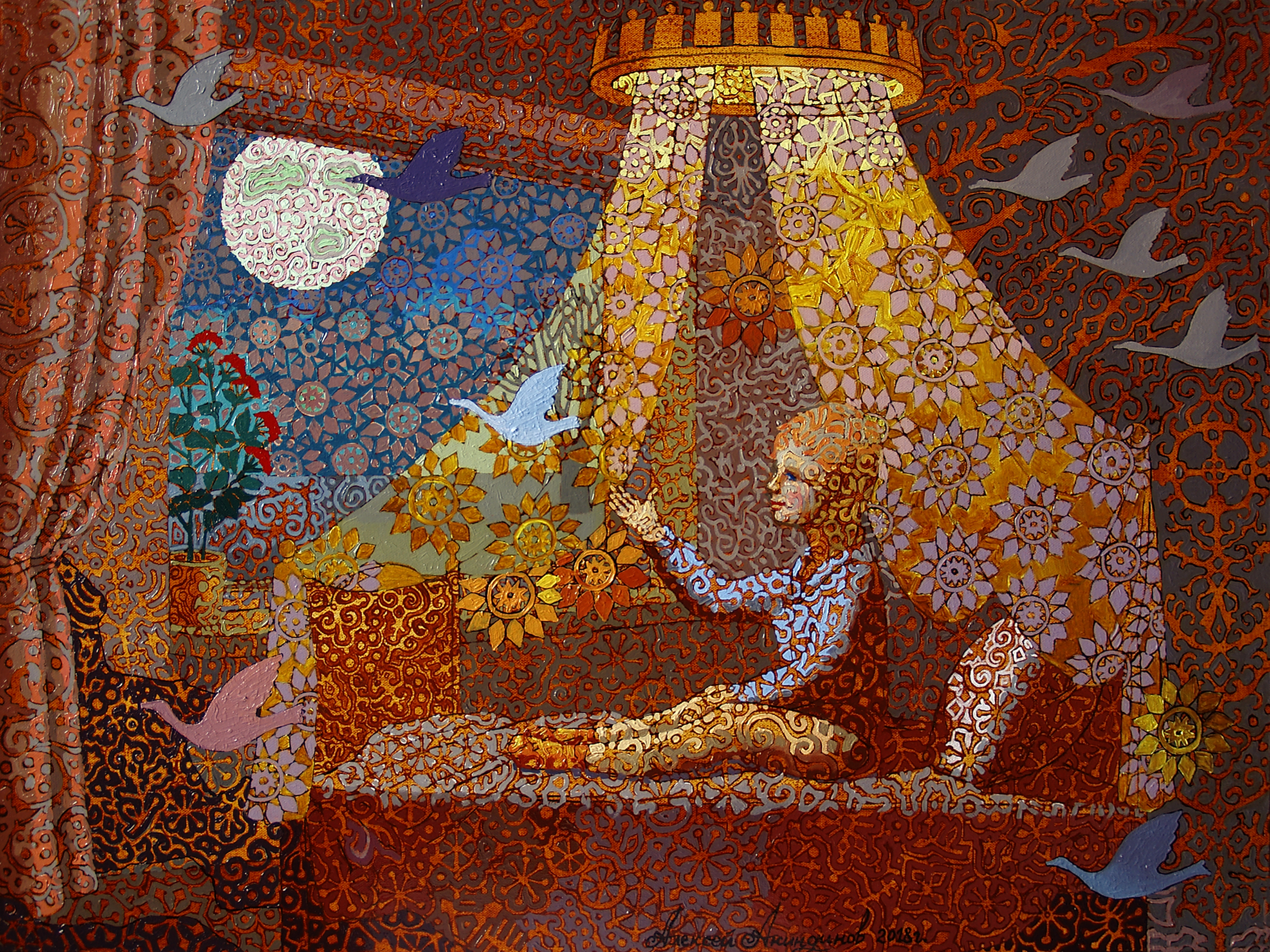
Alexey Akindinov. Moon Tales. 2018

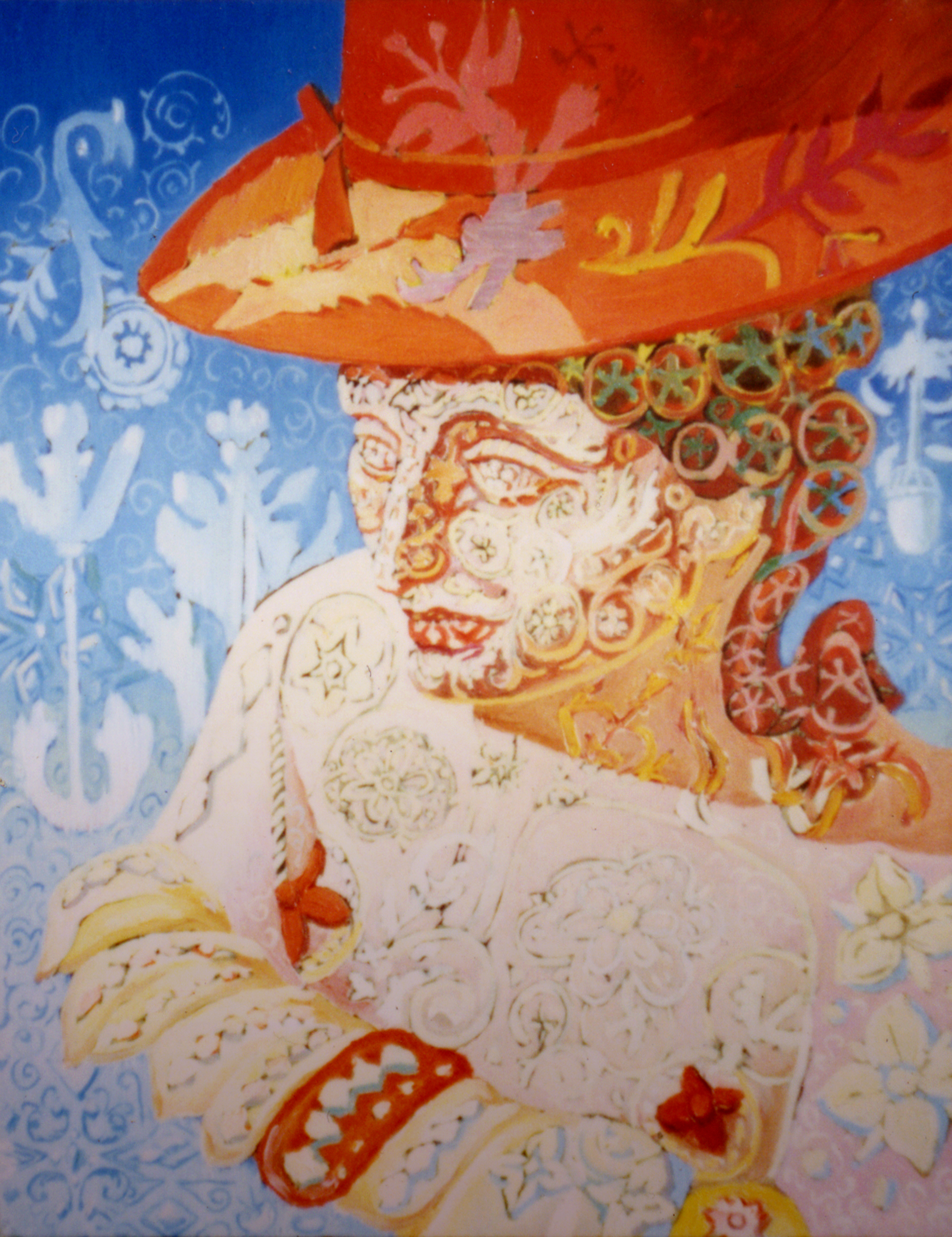
Alexey Akindinov. Laura. 1996

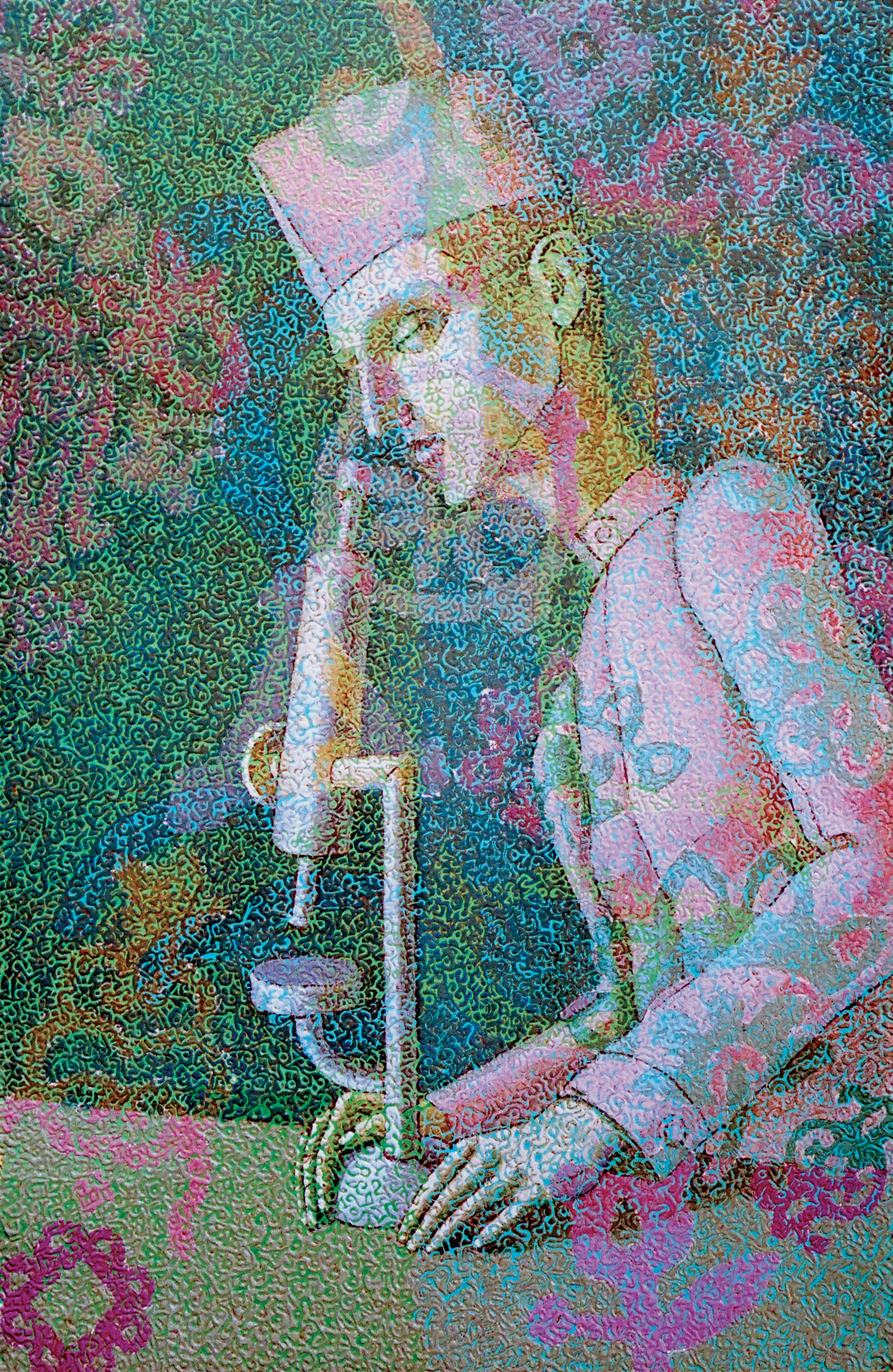
Alexey Akindinov. Clone. 1999

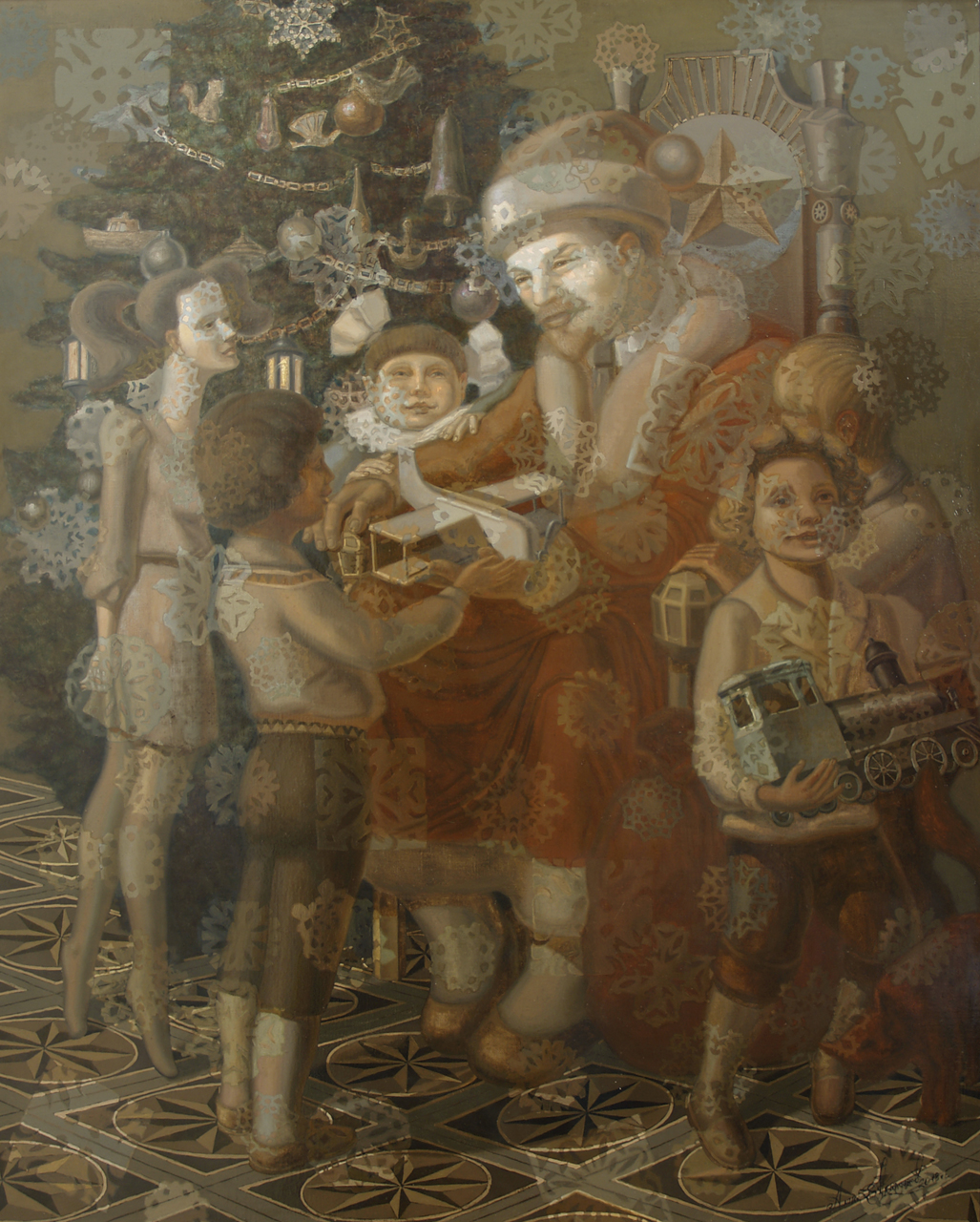
Alexey Akindinov. Lenin in January. 2013

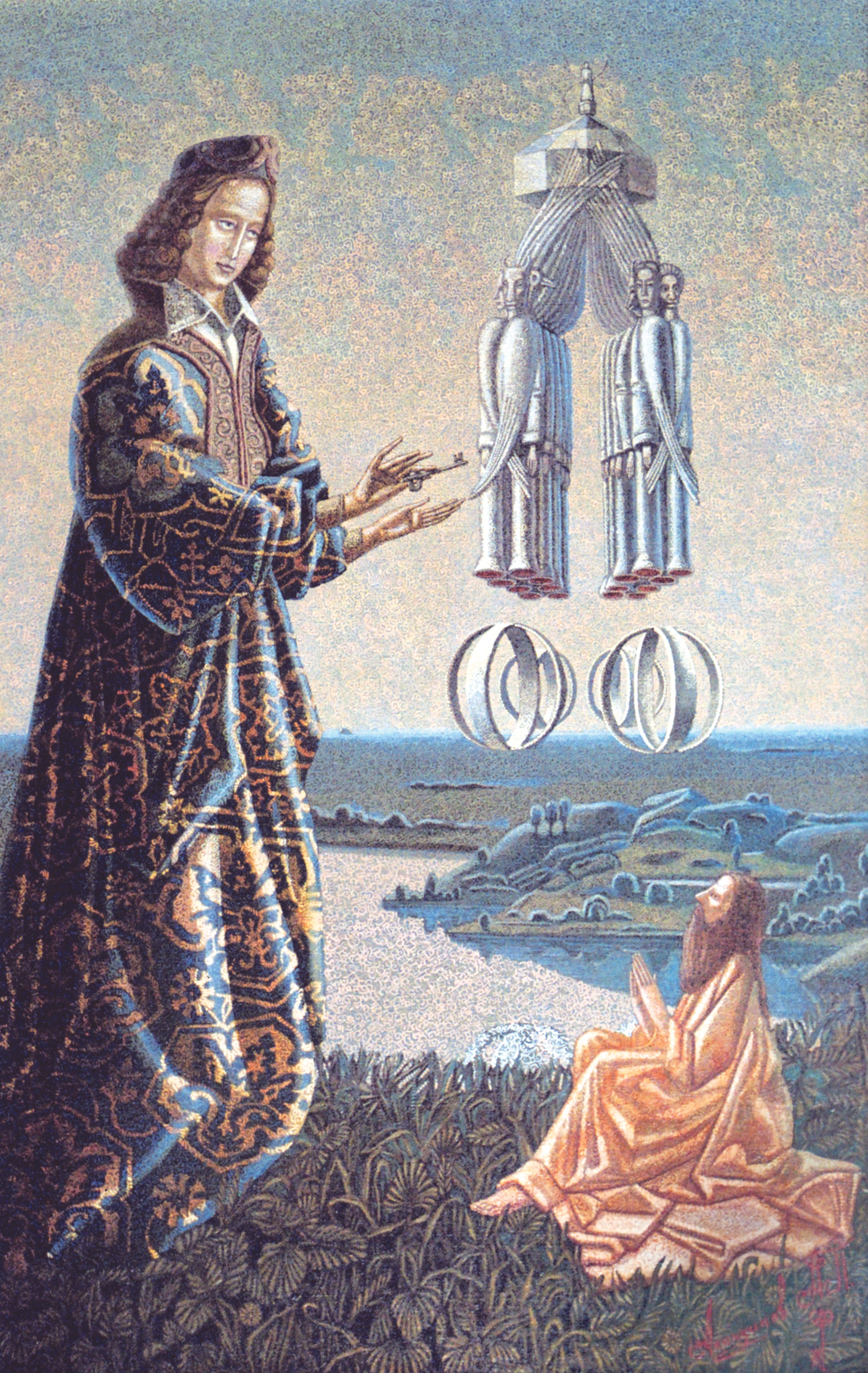
Alexey Akindinov. The Vision of Ezekiel. 2006
