= Vetchinkin (crater) =

Lunar impact crater

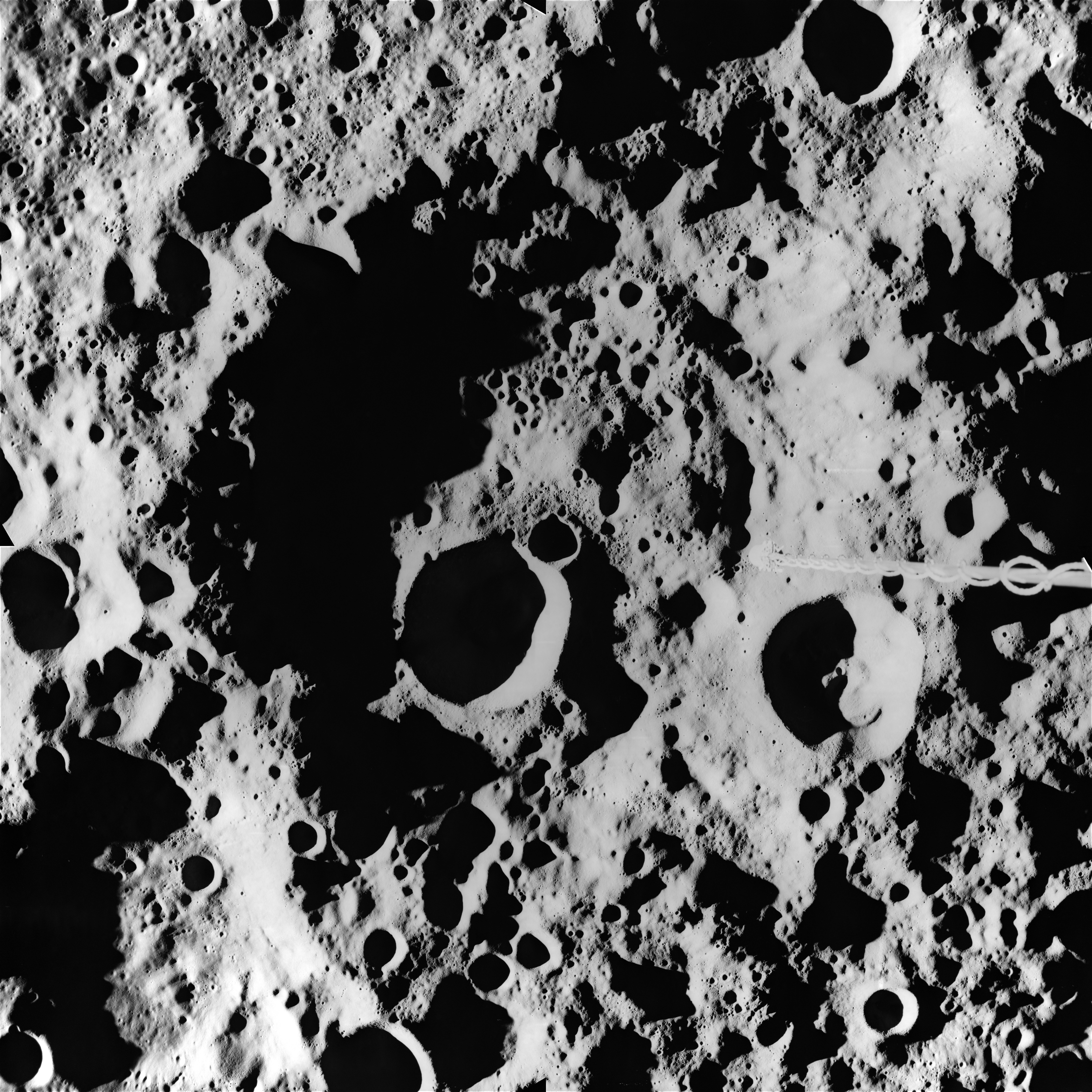
- Apollo 16 mapping camera image. Gamma-ray spectrometer is at right. NASA photo.
- Coordinates: 10.2°N 131.3°E
- Diameter: 98 km
- Colongitude: 230° at sunrise
- Eponym: Vladimir Vetchinkin

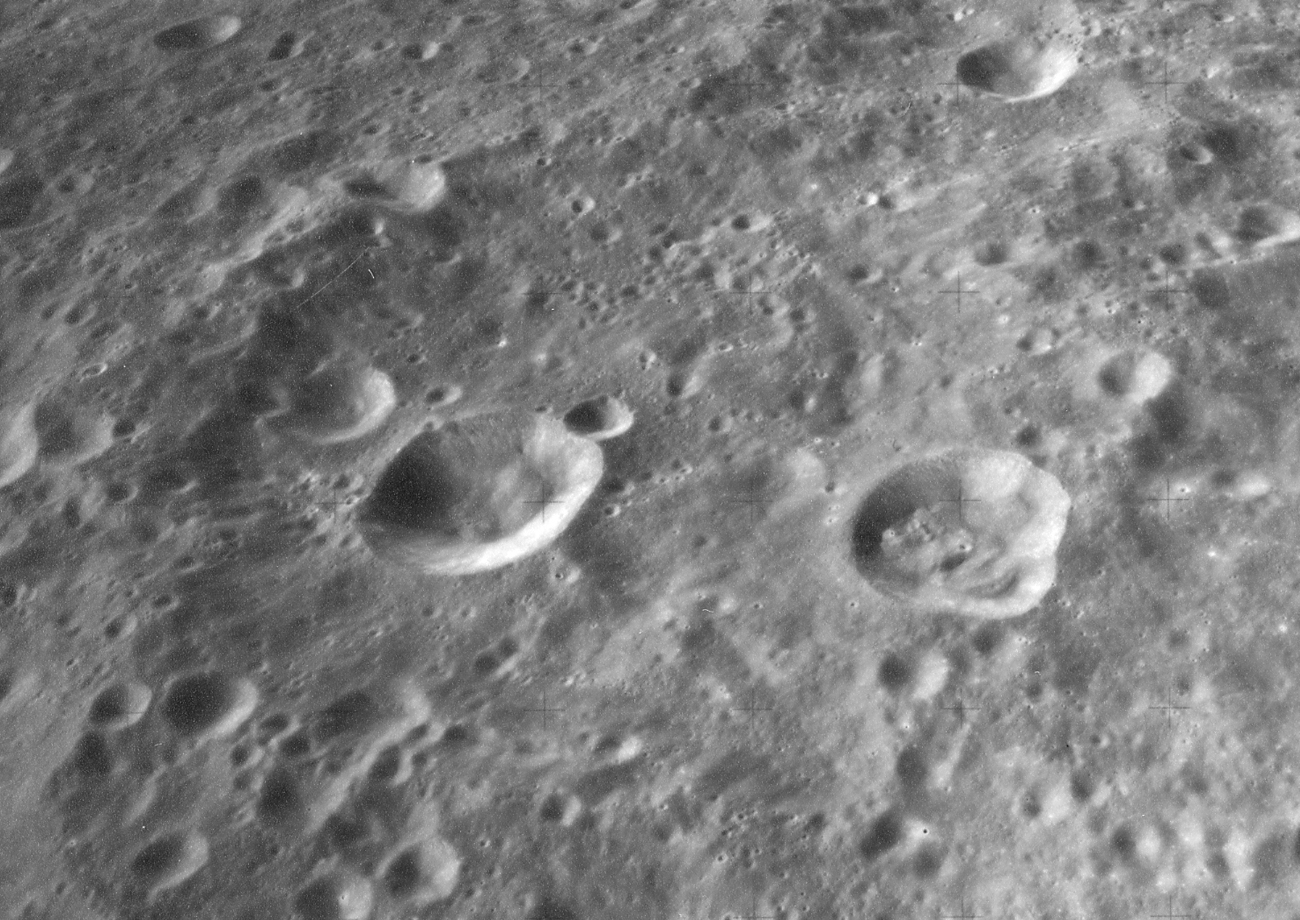
Oblique view also from Apollo 16 with a higher sun angle

Vetchinkin is a degraded lunar impact crater. It is located to the west-northwest of the huge walled plain named Mendeleev, on the far side of the Moon. To the west-northwest of Vetchinkin lies the crater Meshcherskiy and to the south-southeast lies Green.

This crater is heavily worn and eroded, and little remains of the original outer rim. The satellite crater Vetchinkin K falls across the eastern side of the rim, and Vetchinkin Q forms a small but prominent crater in the southwestern part of the floor. The remainder of the crater interior is marked by various small craterlets and minor impacts, and there is little to distinguish this feature from the surrounding battered terrain.

The crater is named after the Russian physicist and engineer Vladimir Vetchinkin. Prior to its naming in 1970 by the IAU, this crater was known as Crater 215.

== Satellite craters ==
By convention these features are identified on lunar maps by placing the letter on the side of the crater midpoint that is closest to Vetchinkin.

Vetchinkin	Latitude	Longitude	Diameter
F	10.0° N	134.0° E	30 km
K	9.6° N	132.3° E	22 km
P	7.7° N	130.3° E	17 km
Q	9.6° N	130.7° E	23 km

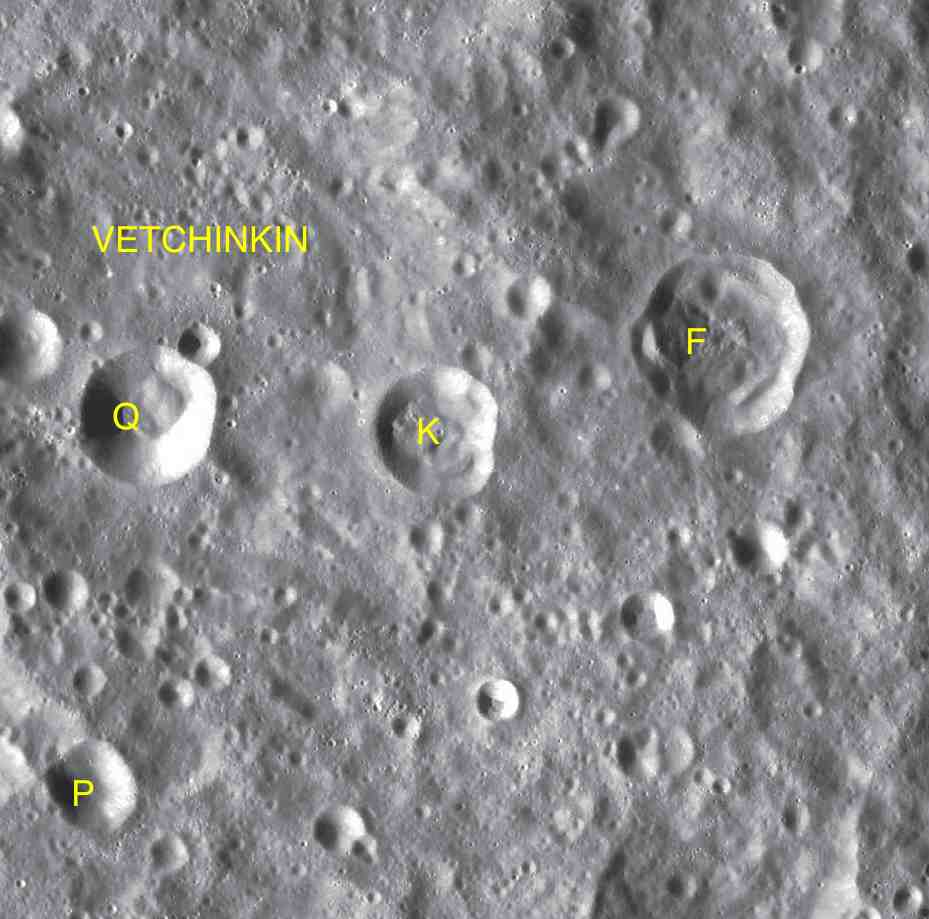
Vetchinkin and its satellite craters
