= Tatiana Grinberg =

Tatiana Valentinovna Grinberg (Russian: Татьяна Валентиновна Гринберг; May 1, 1950 — November 6, 2025) was a Soviet and Russian artist, and an author of literary works.

== Biography ==
Grinberg (Kharchikova, Russian: Харчикова) was born in Baku in 1950, and lived in Moscow and Akhtubinsk for some time. Later, she moved to Novosibirsk. In her youth, for about a year she attended the art studio of Aleksandr Chernobrovtsev.

== Commentary ==
Art critic Andrey Yepishin writes about her art: "From the very beginning, Tatyana unexpectedly revealed herself as a passionate and even daring artist. Bold in depth and sharpness of plastic design, form and color. Tatiana's canvases invariably attract the viewer's attention with the power of emotional impact, expressive composition, and rich color contrasts"
