= Vladimir Vetchinkin =

Vladimir Petrovich Vetchinkin (Russian: Владимир Петрович Ветчинкин) (June 29, 1888 - March 6, 1950) was a Soviet scientist in the field of aerodynamics, aeronautics, and wind energy, Doctor of Technical Sciences (1927), Honored Science Worker of the RSFSR (1946).

== Biography ==
Vladimir Petrovich was born in Kutno (then in the Russian division of Poland), the son of a Russian military officer. Vetchinkin graduated from Moscow Higher Technical School (MVTU) in 1915, the favorite student of Nikolay Zhukovsky and generally viewed as his successor. In 1913, they had created a vortex-sheet theory of aircraft propellers. In 1916, Vetchinkin and Zhukovsky created the aviation calculation and test bureau in the wind-tunnel laboratory of the Moscow Higher Technical School, and in 1918 he helped found the Zhukovsky Central Institute of Aerodynamics (TsAGI). He became a professor at the Zhukovsky Air Force Academy in 1923.

In 1914, Vetchinkin began working with Anatoly Georgievich Ufimtsev on high performance windmills for electric power generation. Zhukovsky created a new division of wind motors in TsAGI to support this effort. They built an 8 kilowatt experimental wind generator in Kursk in 1929. To store energy during lulls in the wind, it used a 360 kilogram flywheel contained in a vacuum chamber.

From 1921 to 1925, Vetchinkin lectured on the theory of rockets and space travel, and was the first to present a correct theory of interplanetary flight based on elliptical transfer orbits (an idea usually attributed to Walter Hohmann). He was a member of the Society for Studies of Interplanetary Travel. From 1925 to 1927, he worked on problems of cruise missiles and jet aircraft, and he took part in the activity of RNII (Scientific Research Institute of Jet Propulsion). Vetchinkin was a key supporter of rocketry pioneer Yuri Kondratyuk, and helped him get his work published.

He died in Moscow in 1950.

The lunar crater Vetchinkin, on the far side of the Moon, is named after him.
