= Ivan Vsevolodovich Meshcherskiy =

Russian mathematician

Ivan Meshcherskiy Иван Мещерский
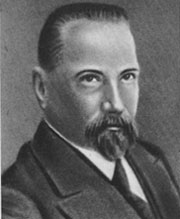
- Ivan Vsevolodovich Meshchersky
- Born: 10 August [O.S. 29 July] 1859; Arkhangelsk, Arkhangelsk Governorate, Russian Empire
- Died: 7 January 1935 (aged 75); Leningrad, Russian SFSR, Soviet Union
- Education: Saint Petersburg Imperial University
- Scientific career
- Doctoral advisor: Pafnuty Chebyshev
- Doctoral students: Aleksey Krylov, Gury Kolosov, Alexander Friedmann

Ivan Vsevolodovich Meshchersky (Russian: Ива́н Все́володович Меще́рский, 1859–1935) was a Russian and Soviet mathematician who gained fame for his work on mechanics, notably the motion of bodies of variable mass.

== Biography ==
Ivan Vsevolodovich Meshcherskiy was born in Arkhangelsk. After graduation from Arkhangelsk Gymnasium, Meshcherskiy studied mathematics at the Saint Petersburg Imperial University from 1878 to 1882.
