= Computed torque control =

Robot control

Computed torque control is a control scheme used in motion control in robotics. It combines feedback linearization via a PID controller of the error with a dynamical model of the controlled robot.

Let the dynamics of the controlled robot be described by

$\mathbf{M}\left( \vec\theta \right) \ddot\vec\theta + \mathbf{C}\left( \vec\theta, \dot\vec\theta \right) \dot\vec\theta + \vec\tau_g \left(\vec\theta\right) = \vec\tau$ where $\vec\theta \in \mathbb{R}^N$ is the state vector of joint variables that describe the system, $\mathbf{M}\left(\vec\theta\right)$ is the inertia matrix, $\mathbf{C}\left( \vec\theta, \dot\vec\theta \right) \dot\vec\theta$ is the vector Coriolis and centrifugal torques, $\vec\tau_g \left(\vec\theta\right)$ are the torques caused by gravity and $\vec\tau$ is the vector of joint torque inputs.

Assume that we have an approximate model of the system made up of $\tilde\mathbf{M}\left( \vec\theta \right), \tilde\mathbf{C}\left( \vec\theta, \dot\vec\theta \right), \tilde\vec\tau_g \left(\vec\theta\right)$. This model does not need to be perfect, but it should justify the approximations $\mathbf{M}\left( \vec\theta \right)^{-1} \tilde\mathbf{M}\left( \vec\theta \right) \approx \mathbf 1$ and $\mathbf{M} ^{-1} \left( \mathbf{C}\left( \vec\theta, \dot\vec\theta \right) \dot\vec\theta + \vec\tau_g \left(\vec\theta\right) \right) \approx \mathbf{M} ^{-1} \left( \tilde\mathbf{C}\left( \vec\theta, \dot\vec\theta \right) \dot\vec\theta + \tilde\vec\tau_g \left(\vec\theta\right) \right)$.

Given a desired trajectory $\vec\theta_d(t)$ the error relative to the current state $\vec\theta(t)$ is then $\vec\theta_e(t) = \vec\theta_d(t) - \vec\theta(t)$.

We can then set the input of the system to be

$\vec\tau(t) = \tilde\mathbf{M}\left( \vec\theta \right) \left( \ddot\vec\theta_d(t) + K_p \vec\theta_e(t) + K_i \int_0^t \ddot\vec\theta_e(t') dt' + K_d \dot\vec\theta_e(t) \right) + \tilde\mathbf{C}\left( \vec\theta, \dot\vec\theta \right) + \tilde\vec\tau_g \left(\vec\theta\right)$

With this input the dynamics of the entire systems becomes

$$\begin{align}
\mathbf{M}\left( \vec\theta \right) \ddot\vec\theta +
\mathbf{C}\left( \vec\theta, \dot\vec\theta \right) \dot\vec\theta +
\vec\tau_g \left(\vec\theta\right)
=&
\tilde\mathbf{M}\left( \vec\theta \right) \left(
\ddot\vec\theta_d(t)
+ K_p \vec\theta_e(t)
+ K_i \int_0^t \ddot\vec\theta_e(t') dt'
+ K_d \dot\vec\theta_e(t)
\right) +
\tilde\mathbf{C}\left( \vec\theta, \dot\vec\theta \right) +
\tilde\vec\tau_g \left(\vec\theta\right)
\\
\ddot\vec\theta +
\mathbf{M}\left( \vec\theta \right)^{-1} \left(
\mathbf{C}\left( \vec\theta, \dot\vec\theta \right) \dot\vec\theta +
\vec\tau_g \left(\vec\theta\right)
\right)
=&
\underbrace{
\mathbf{M}\left( \vec\theta \right)^{-1}
\tilde\mathbf{M}\left( \vec\theta \right)
}_{\approx \mathbf{1}}
\left(
\ddot\vec\theta_d(t)
+ K_p \vec\theta_e(t)
+ K_i \int_0^t \ddot\vec\theta_e(t') dt'
+ K_d \dot\vec\theta_e(t)
\right) +
\mathbf{M}\left( \vec\theta \right)^{-1} \left(
\tilde\mathbf{C}\left( \vec\theta, \dot\vec\theta \right) +
\tilde\vec\tau_g \left(\vec\theta\right)
\right)
\\
\ddot\vec\theta
= &
\ddot\vec\theta_d(t)
+ K_p \vec\theta_e(t)
+ K_i \int_0^t \ddot\vec\theta_e(t') dt'
+ K_d \dot\vec\theta_e(t)
\\
0 = &
\ddot\vec\theta_e
+ K_p \vec\theta_e(t)
+ K_i \int_0^t \ddot\vec\theta_e(t') dt'
+ K_d \dot\vec\theta_e(t)
\end{align}$$

and the normal methods for PID controller tuning can be applied. In this way the complicated nonlinear control problem has been reduced to a relatively simple linear control problem.
