= Zero dynamics =

In mathematics and control theory, zero dynamics describes the internal behavior of a dynamic system when its outputs are constrained to zero through control inputs (e.g., maintaining a robot arm at a fixed position while internal states continue to evolve). Even when outputs are held at zero, the system's internal dynamics may persist, influencing stability and performance.

Understanding zero dynamics helps design robust controllers in applications like robotics, feedback linearization, and control engineering.

== History ==
The idea was introduced thirty years ago as the nonlinear approach to the concept of transmission of zeros. The original purpose of introducing the concept was to develop an asymptotic stabilization with a set of guaranteed regions of attraction (semi-global stabilizability), to make the overall system stable.

== Initial working ==
Given the internal dynamics of any system, zero dynamics refers to the control action chosen in which the output variables of the system are kept identically zero. While various systems have an equally distinctive set of zeros, such as decoupling zeros, invariant zeros, and transmission zeros, the reason for developing this concept was to control the non-minimum phase and nonlinear systems effectively.

== Applications ==
The concept is widely utilized in SISO mechanical systems, whereby applying a few heuristic approaches, zeros can be identified for various linear systems. Zero dynamics adds an essential feature to the overall system’s analysis and the design of the controllers. Mainly its behavior plays a significant role in measuring the performance limitations of specific feedback systems. In a Single Input Single Output system, the zero dynamics can be identified by using junction structure patterns. In other words, using concepts like bond graph models can help to point out the potential direction of the SISO systems.

Apart from its application in nonlinear standardized systems, similar controlled results can be obtained by using zero dynamics on nonlinear discrete-time systems. In this scenario, the application of zero dynamics can be an interesting tool to measure the performance of nonlinear digital design systems (nonlinear discrete-time systems).

Before the advent of zero dynamics, the problem of acquiring non-interacting control systems by using internal stability was not specifically discussed. However, with the asymptotic stability present within the zero dynamics of a system, static feedback can be ensured. Such results make zero dynamics an interesting tool to guarantee the internal stability of non-interacting control systems.
