= Hybrid bond graph =

Dynamical system

A hybrid bond graph is a graphical description of a physical dynamic system with discontinuities (i.e., a hybrid dynamical system). Similar to a regular bond graph, it is an energy-based technique. However, it allows instantaneous switching of the junction structure, which may violate the principle of continuity of power (Mosterman and Biswas, 1998).
