= Henry Paynter =

American scientist

Henry Martyn Paynter (August 11, 1923 – June 14, 2002) was an American scientist and professor of mechanical engineering at Massachusetts Institute of Technology. He is best known as the inventor of bond graphs, a methodology to describe dynamic systems.

== Biography ==
Henry Martyn Paynter IV was born in Evanston, Illinois and grew up in New York City and its environs. He received the B.S. in civil engineering in 1944, the M.S. in mathematics and science in 1949, and the first Sc.D. ever awarded in hydroelectric engineering in 1951, all from MIT.

At MIT he joined the Department of Civil Engineering in 1946 and became an assistant professor in 1951. He joined the Department of Mechanical Engineering in 1954 on a half-time basis to initiate a systems engineering curriculum. He became full time in mechanical engineering in 1959 and was promoted to associate professor the following year. He became a full professor in 1964.

He was regarded as a creative, charismatic, and passionate teacher who deeply influenced the careers of his students. He urged them to think "big" and "deep" about engineering and science. He published on a wide variety of subjects in more than 100 papers, patents, articles, and book chapters, as well as several books. After he retired, Paynter was a senior lecturer in mechanical engineering.

Paynter had been awarded the Alfred Noble Prize of the Joint Engineering Societies in 1953. He was elected to the National Academy of Engineering in 1977. In 1973 the American Society of Mechanical Engineers (ASME) awarded him the Thurston Lecture Award, in 1979 the Oldenburger Medal, and in 1984 the ACC Education Award. His Thurston Lecture was entitled "Edison in Retrospect: Experimental Physicist and Systems Engineer."

=== Family and death ===
Paynter was married to Gayllis Anne Beasley and fathered six children. He died at Vermont at the age of 78.

== Work ==
Paynter is celebrated for his contributions to "the analysis, design and control of complex multimedia systems and for developing the Bond graph modeling language."

=== Analog computing ===
In his work, Paynter became one of the world's leading experts in analog computing. His work was closely associated with George Philbrick, who is credited along with Clarence A. Lovell of Bell Labs as the developer of the operational amplifier.

Paynter's earliest research lead to the formation of the Pi-Square Engineering Company. This company applied fast electronic analog computing to industrial process control. Paynter also collaborated closely with the Woodward Governor Company on hydro plant control.

=== Bond graphs ===
A simple mass–spring–damper system, and its equivalent bond-graph form

Bond graphs are a unique way of describing dynamic models, designed to model the interaction between different kinds of physical systems, like electrical, mechanical, hydraulical and chemical. This is possible because one thing all these components have in common is power. Power can flow from one component to another and bond graphs are designed to keep track of these flows in an easy way.

Bond graphs were invented on April 24, 1959:

In 1954, I moved over to the MIT mechanical engineering department to establish the first systems engineering subjects at MIT. It was this specific task which 5 years later produced bond graphs, drawing naturally upon all the attitudes and experience indicated above. So it was on April 24, 1959, when I was to deliver the lecture as posted below, I awoke that morning with the idea of the 0,1-junctions somehow planted in my head overnight! Moreover the very symbols (0,1) for [Kirchhoff's current law] and [Kirchhoff's voltage law], respectively, made direct the correspondence between circuit duality and logical duality. (The limited use of these 3-ports in the hydro plant bond graph above hardly does justice to their role in rendering bond graphs a complete and formal discipline.)

— Prof. Henry M. Paynter, The Gestation and Birth of Bond Graphs (c. 2000)

The Bond graph modelling approach was presented for the first time in the "Ports, Energy and Thermodynamic Systems" on April 24, 1959, at MIT, which was later published (Paynter, 1961). Paynter was elected to the National Academy of Engineering in 1997, one of the highest professional distinctions accorded to an engineer.

== Publications, a selection ==
- Paynter, Henry M., Analysis and design of engineering systems, The M.I.T. Press, Boston, 1961 ISBN 0-262-16004-8.
