= George Oster =

American mathematical biologist

George F. Oster
- Born: April 20, 1940; New York City, New York, U.S.
- Died: April 15, 2018 (aged 77)
- Education: U.S. Merchant Marine Academy; Columbia University; University of California, Berkeley
- Scientific career
- Fields: Biology
- Workplaces: University of California, Berkeley
- Thesis: High temperature saturated liquid and vapor densities and the critical point of cesium (1967)
- Doctoral advisor: Charles F. Bonilla

George Frederick Oster NAS (April 20, 1940 – April 15, 2018) was an American mathematical biologist, and Professor of Cell and Developmental Biology at University of California, Berkeley. He made seminal contributions to several varied fields including chaos theory, population dynamics, membrane dynamics and molecular motors. He was a 1985 MacArthur Fellow.

== Early career ==
He graduated from Columbia University, with a Ph.D., in Nuclear Engineering in 1967. He was appointed as an assistant professor in at UC Berkeley in 1970. In the early 1970s Oster collaborated with Aharon Katzir-Katchalsky on statistical mechanics. He also collaborated with Alan Perelson and Aharon Katzir-Katchalsky on Network Thermodynamics: the application of Bond Graphs to the thermodynamic modelling of biophysical systems.

Oster's work with E. O. Wilson on populations dynamics of social animals, particularly ants, is considered pioneering work in evolution in social insects. Oster was one of the first theoretical biologists to understand that a complex interplay between mechanical and chemical forces was at the root of most biological phenomena.

== Later career ==
He was elected to the National Academy of Sciences in 2004. Oster was a Guggenheim Fellow, and a member of the science board of the Santa Fe Institute.

== Awards ==
- 1975 Guggenheim Fellowship
- 1984 MacArthur Fellows Program
- 1992 Weldon Memorial Prize
- Winfree Prize for Mathematical Biology
- Sackler International Prize in Biophysics
