= Aharon Katzir =

Israeli scientist (1914–1972)

- אַהֲרֹן קָצִיר
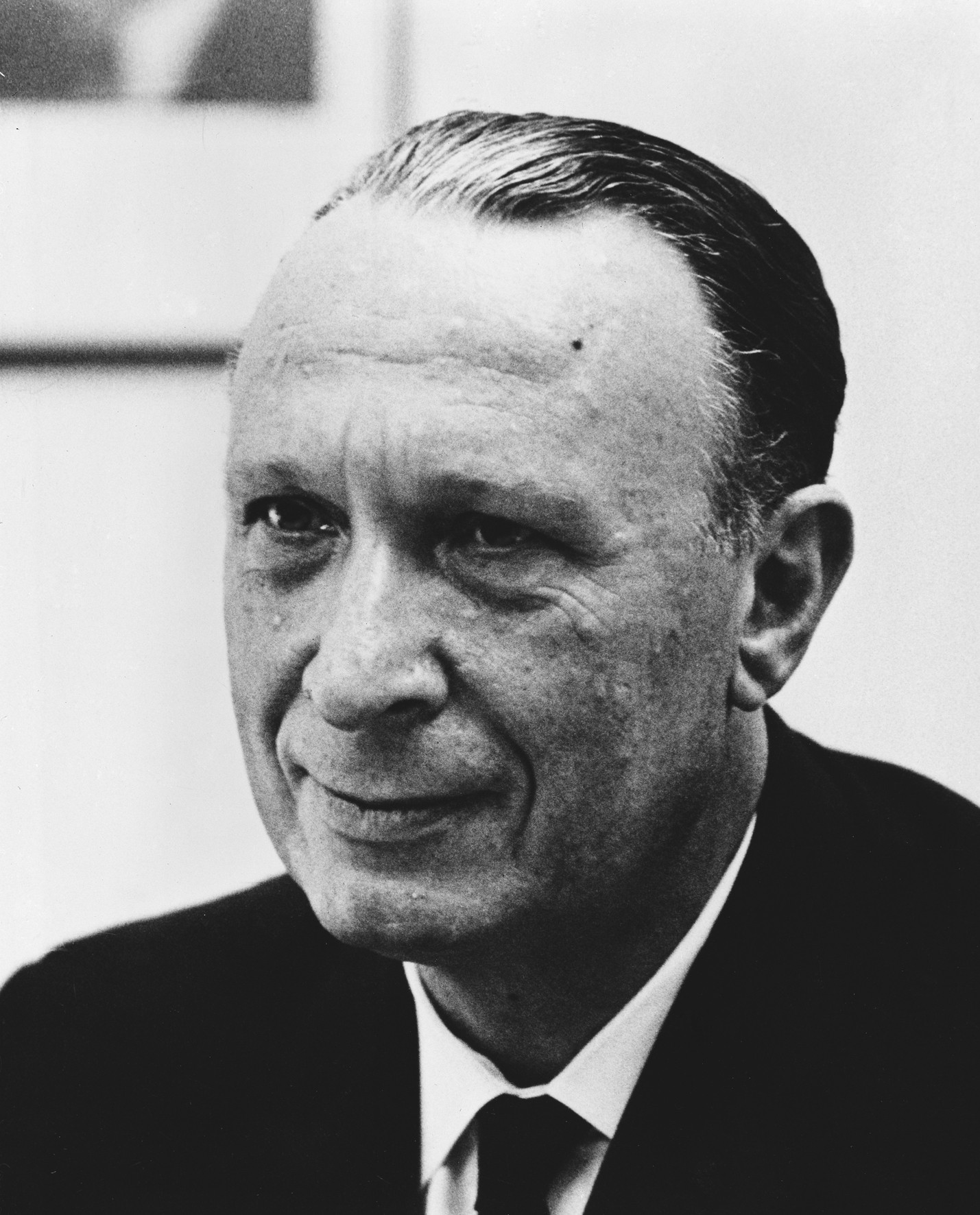
- Born: September 15, 1914; Łódź, Congress Poland, Russian Empire
- Died: May 30, 1972 (aged 57); Lod Airport, Central District, Israel
- Cause of death: Murdered in the Lod Airport massacre
- Occupation: Pioneer in the study of the electrochemistry of biopolymers
- Relatives: Ephraim Katzir (brother)
- Awards: 1950 Weizmann Prize; 1961 Israel Prize

Aharon Katzir (Hebrew: אַהֲרֹן קָצִיר; born Aharon Katchalsky; September 15, 1914 – May 30, 1972) was an Israeli scientist known as a pioneer in the study of the electrochemistry of biopolymers.

== Biography ==
Born 1914 in Łódź, Poland, he moved to Mandatory Palestine in 1925, where he taught at the Hebrew University of Jerusalem. There, he adopted his Hebrew surname Katzir. He was a faculty member at the Weizmann Institute of Science in Rehovot, as well as at the department of medical physics and biophysics at the University of California, Berkeley.

He was murdered in a terrorist attack at Lod Airport in 1972 in which 26 people were killed and 80 injured. His younger brother, Ephraim Katzir, became the president of Israel in 1973.

== Career ==
Katzir studied biology, chemistry, mathematics, and philosophy at the Hebrew University in Jerusalem. He completed his doctorate with honors. In late 1945, Abba Kovner, a former Lithuanian Jewish partisan leader, met with Aharon, along with his brother Ephraim, to secure poison to use in the Nakam plot, taking advantage of their access to Hebrew University laboratory chemicals. Chaim Weizmann invited him to join the Weizmann Institute of Science in 1948. Katzir established a Department of Polymer Research at the institute and chaired it until his death. He also established a Department of Plastics.

Katzir's study of polyelectrolytes led to the development of the field of mechanochemistry. For his innovations, he was awarded the Israel Prize along with his pupil Ora Kedem. Katzir published the associated mathematics in Non-Equilibrium Thermodynamics in Biophysics in 1965. What became known as Kedem-Katchalsky equations described the permeability of membranes and were enthusiastically adopted by biophysicists.

In the early 1970s, with George Oster and Alan Perelson, he wrote seminal papers on Network Thermodynamics showing the role of Bond Graphs in the thermodynamic modelling in biophysical systems.

Katzir was a member of Haganah and one of the founders of HEMED, the scientific arm of the Israel Defense Forces. He was also instrumental in the founding of Ben-Gurion University. He lectured widely and published his thoughts in The Crucible of Scientific Revolution (1971). The book contains remarks about the origins of life, nanotechnology, and DNA computers.

Katzir led a conference at the Massachusetts Institute of Technology in 1972 on the connections between biology and cognition and consciousness. He asserted that the work of Ilya Prigogine on complex systems could inform the understanding of neurology, and by extension, creativity and culture.

== Posthumous recognition ==
A series of Hebrew lectures was held at Tel Aviv University in memory of Katzir in 2003 and 2004. It was organized by his son Avrahm, a professor of physics. The series was titled In the Crucible of the Revolution (BeKur HaMahapecha), after Katzir's 1971 book. It featured lectures by Nobel Prize laureates Daniel Kahneman and Aaron Ciechanover, and philosopher Hilary Putnam.

A center at the Weizmann Institute of Science is named after Katzir, as well as public schools in Tel Aviv and elsewhere.

The Aharon Katzir Young Investigator Award is conferred annually by the International Neural Network Society upon "two exceptionally promising young investigators in the field of neural networks."

The Professor Aharon Katzir Award is awarded annually by Hebrew University to an exceptional thesis in the experimental sciences.

The Katchalsky crater on the Moon bears his name.

== Textbooks ==
- Katchalsky, Aharon; Curran, Peter F. (1965). Nonequilibrium Thermodynamics in Biophysics. Harvard University Press.

== See also ==
- List of Israel Prize recipients
- Science and technology in Israel
