= Bingham (crater) =

Crater on the Moon

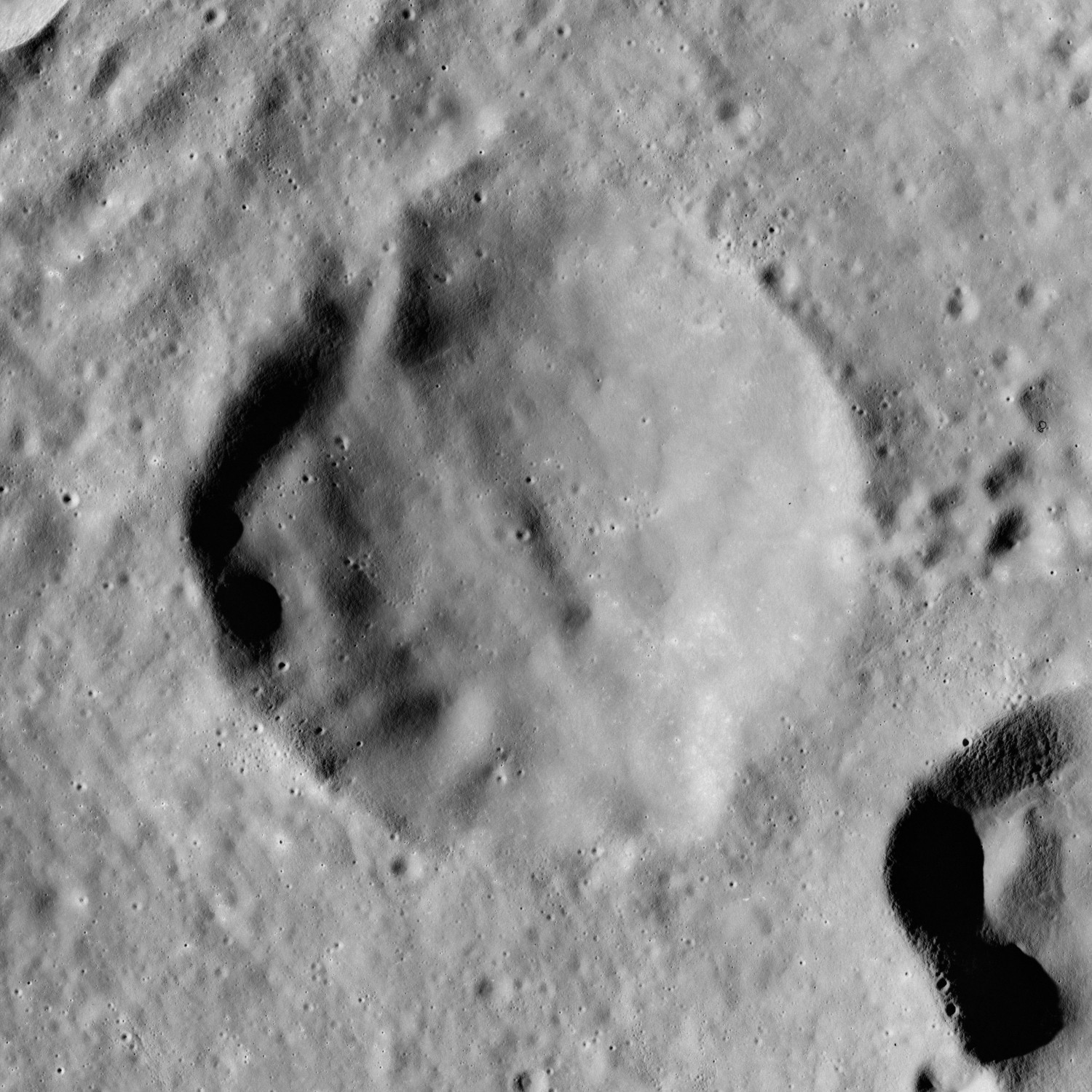
- Apollo 16 Mapping camera image
- Coordinates: 8.02°N 115.05°E
- Diameter: 34.99 km (21.74 mi)
- Depth: Unknown
- Colongitude: 235° at sunrise
- Eponym: Hiram Bingham III

Bingham is a small lunar impact crater that is located on the far side of the Moon, relative to the Earth. It lies just to the southeast of the much larger crater Lobachevskiy, and the northwestern part of the rim of Bingham is partly overlaid by ejecta from Lobachevsky. To the northeast of Bingham is the crater Guyot, and a little over a crater diameter to the south-southeast is Katchalsky. This is a roughly circular crater formation with a slight outward bulge along the southeastern side. The interior is irregular, with a ridge-like rise running from the northwest inner wall to the southeast.

This crater is named after the American academic, explorer and politician Hiram Bingham III (1875-1956). Its designation was formally adopted by the International Astronomical Union in 1976.

== Satellite craters ==
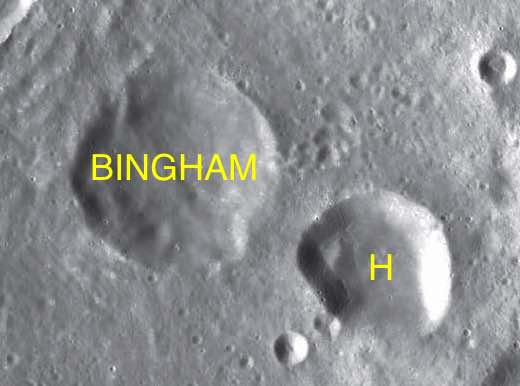
Bingham and its satellite crater Bingham H

By convention these features are identified on lunar maps by placing the letter on the side of the crater midpoint that is closest to Bingham.

Bingham	Latitude	Longitude	Diameter
H	7.5° N	116.2° E	26 km

== In popular culture ==
Bingham, along with another crater, Viviani, was referenced in the Midsomer Murders season 14 episode 'Dark Secrets'.
