= Recht =

Recht is a German and Dutch word meaning "right" in both the sense of being correct or the legal sense of rights. It may refer to:

== Topography ==
- Recht, a sub-municipality of the city of St. Vith in Belgium
- Recht (crater), a small impact crater on the far side of the Moon

== People with the surname ==
- Albert William Recht (1898–1962), American mathematician and astronomer
- Arthur M. Recht (1938–2018), justice of the Supreme Court of Appeals of West Virginia
- Camille Recht (fl. 1930s), German writer, critic and editor
- Rick Recht (born 1970), American rock musician
- Sruli Recht (born 1977), designer and artist based in Reykjavík, Iceland
- Bernd Rechts, fictional comic book character

== See also ==
- Translating "law" to other European languages
