= Kostinskiy (crater) =

Crater on the Moon

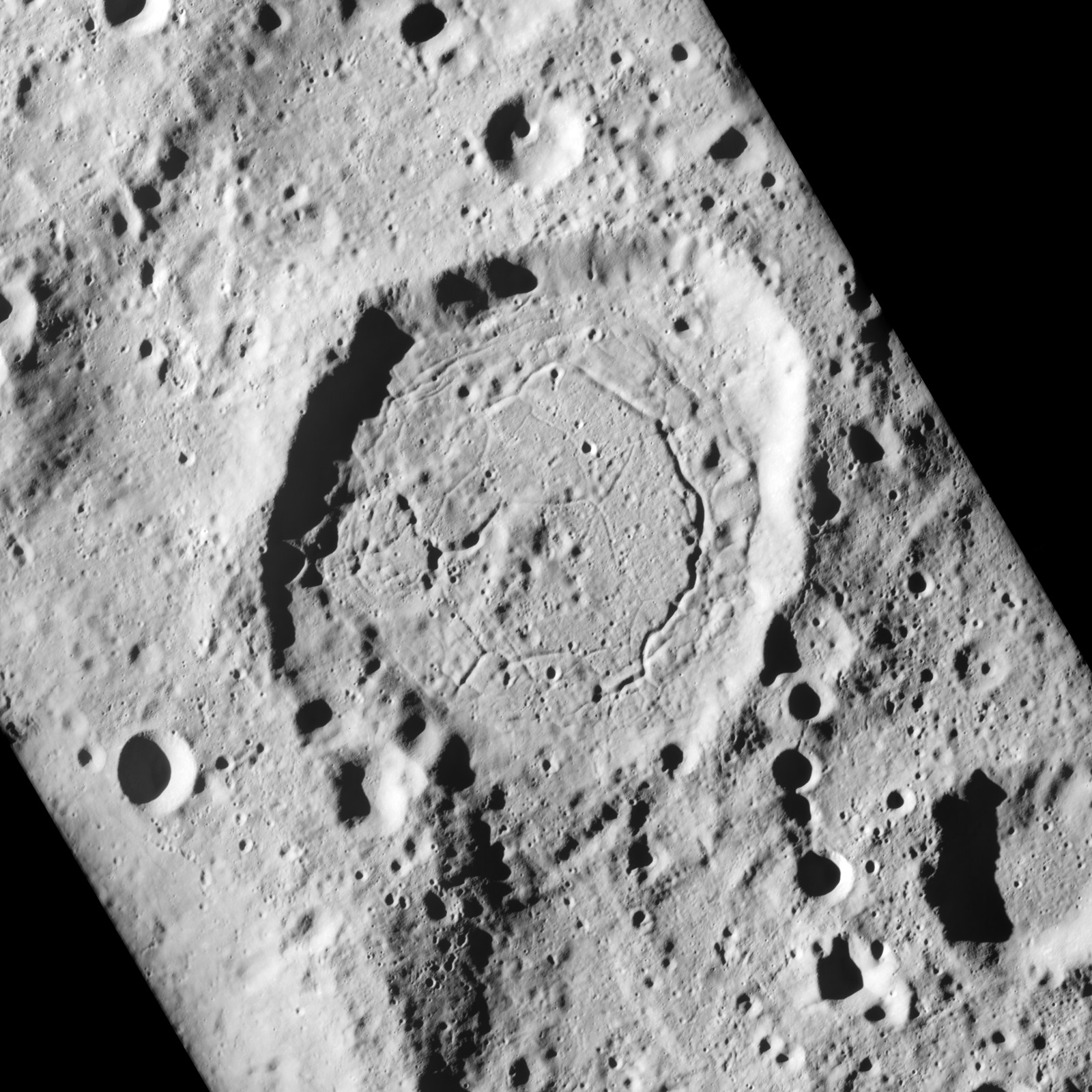
- Apollo 16 panoramic camera image
- Coordinates: 14.7°N 118.8°E
- Diameter: 75 km
- Depth: Unknown
- Colongitude: 242° at sunrise
- Eponym: Sergey K. Kostinskiy

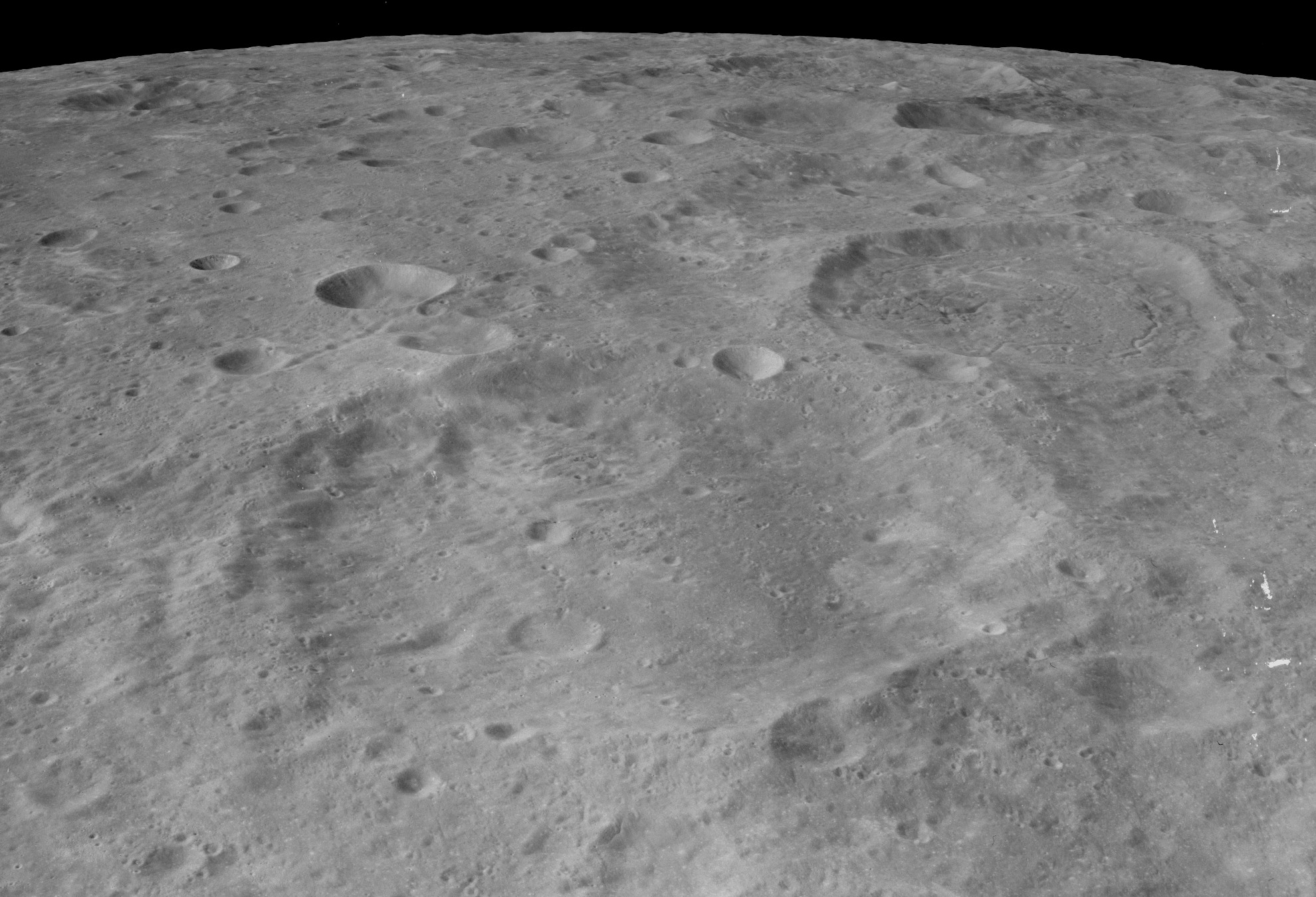
Oblique view of Guyot (center foreground) and Kostinskiy (right of center), from Apollo 16

Kostinsky is a lunar impact crater on the far side of the Moon. It is nearly attached to the northeastern outer rim of the crater Guyot. About one crater diameter to the southeast is Ostwald, and farther to the north is Olcott.

The rim of Kostinsky is eroded, and along the southeast has been nearly worn away. The rim has an outward bulge along the northeastern side. There is a small crater intruding into the eastern rim. The interior floor has some irregularities in the southwest quadrant, and along the edge of the bulging section to the northeast.

The crater was named after the Russian astronomer Sergey Kostinsky in 1970. Prior to that, this crater was known as Crater 210.

== Satellite craters ==
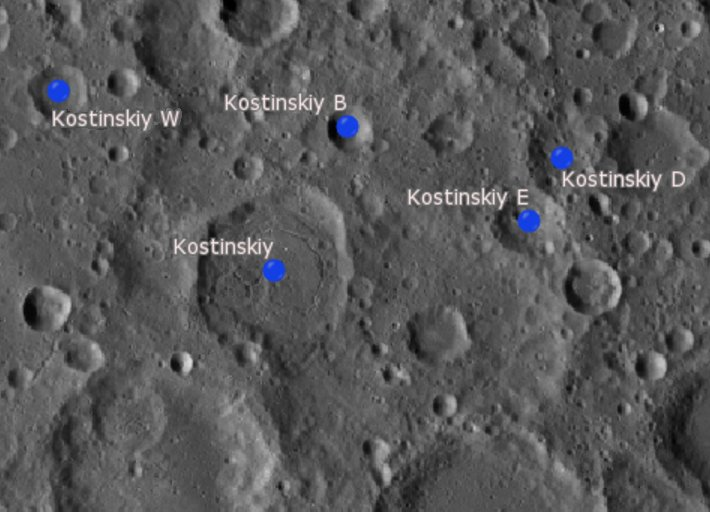
Kostinskiy and its satellite craters

By convention these features are identified on lunar maps by placing the letter on the side of the crater midpoint that is closest to Kostinskiy.

Kostinskiy	Latitude	Longitude	Diameter
B	16.3° N	119.9° E	20 km
D	16.0° N	122.8° E	32 km
E	15.1° N	122.4° E	26 km
W	17.2° N	115.6° E	24 km
