= Albert William Recht =

American mathematician and astronomer

Albert William Recht (March 22, 1898 – January 8, 1962) was an American astronomer, mathematician and educator. He had a 30-year career at the University of Denver. The crater Recht located on the far side of the Moon is named after him.

== Early life and education ==
Recht was born in Cleveland, Ohio. He earned a Ph.D. from the University of Chicago in 1939.

== Career ==
Initially he applied to work as a Spanish instructor at University of Denver. Instead he was hired by the Mathematics Department. He became chair of the mathematics department in 1943–44 and 1947–49.

While at the university he pursued his interest in astronomy, working at the Chamberlin Observatory under the instruction of Herbert Howe. In 1926 Recht became director of the observatory, and full director in 1928.

Over the following eleven years he studied during the summer months to earn his Ph.D. from the University of Chicago in 1939, working at Yerkes Observatory. He did his thesis work on the 6P/d'Arrest comet. Following his graduation, he was most noted for his work on the popularization of astronomy. During the 1950s he began a popular program of public viewing nights at the observatory. However his efforts to preserve the observatory at the time were unsuccessful.
