= Herbert Alonzo Howe =

American astronomer and educator

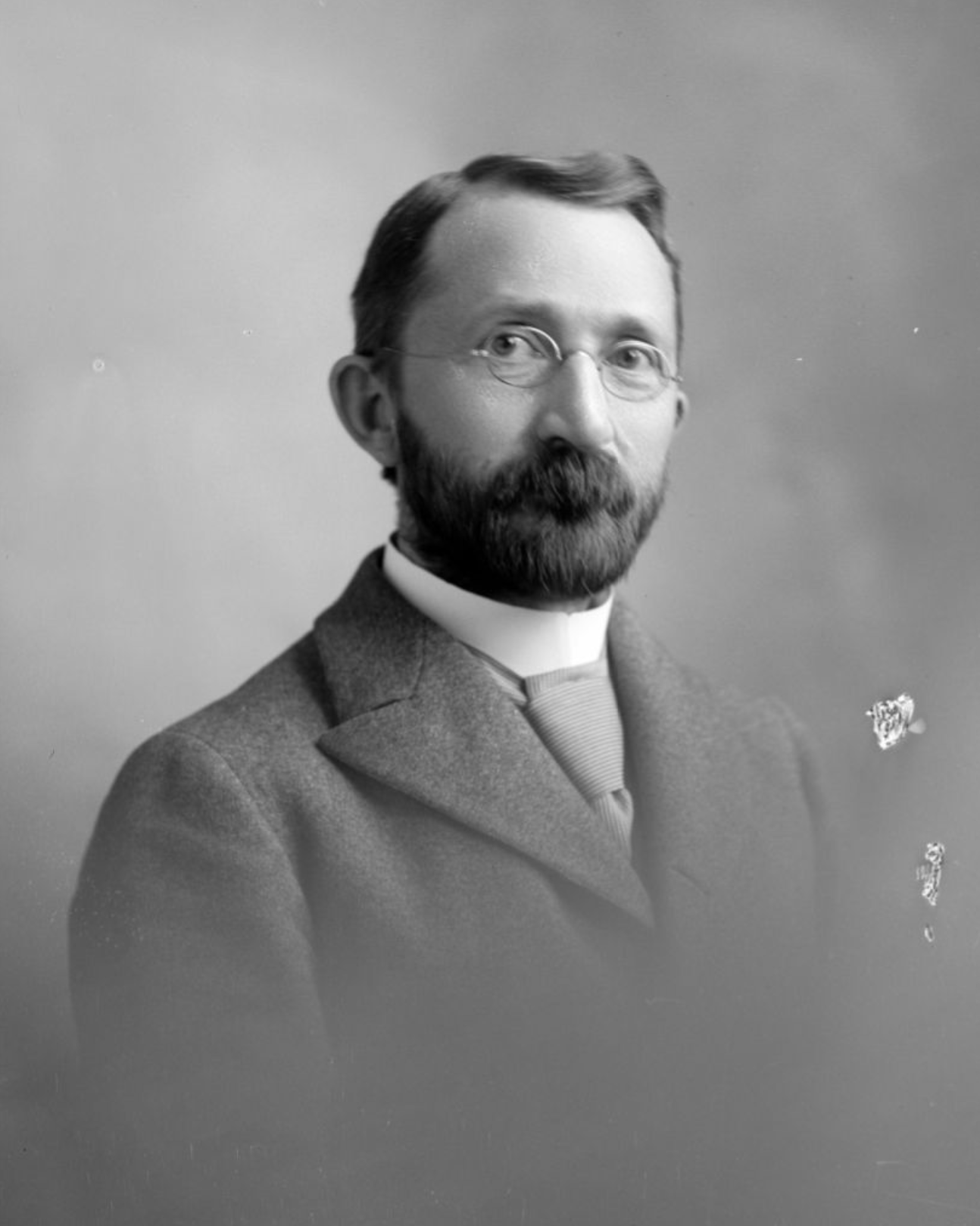
- Howe, circa 1886-1901
- Born: November 22, 1858; Brockport, New York, US
- Died: November 2, 1926 (aged 67); Denver, Colorado, US
- Resting place: Fairmont Cemetery, Denver
- Education: A.B., A.M., Sc.D.
- Alma mater: University of Chicago; University of Cincinnati; Boston University
- Occupations: Astronomer, educator
- Spouse: Fannie McClurg Shattuck
- Children: 4

Herbert Alonzo Howe (November 22, 1858 – November 2, 1926) was an American astronomer and educator.

== Biography ==
Born in Brockport, New York, he was the son of Alonzo J. Howe, a professor at the old University of Chicago, and Julia M. Osgood. During his youth he developed an interest in the stars, witnessing the spectacular Leonid meteor shower of November 1866. He matriculated to the old University of Chicago, where he graduated with an A.B. in 1875 at the age of sixteen. Joining the staff of the Cincinnati Observatory as an assistant, he worked primarily on computing orbital elements and observing double stars. In 1877, he was awarded his A.M. degree from the University of Cincinnati under Professor Ormond Stone.

Long hours of work had left him with health issues, and in 1880 he had two severe pulmonary hemorrhages. As a consequence, he began to consider moving to a different climate. Fortunately, the chancellor of the recently formed University of Denver in Denver, Colorado, offered Howe a position as teacher. His move to Colorado greatly improved his health, so he decided to remain with the institution despite the lack of astronomical observing facilities at the site. He was made professor of mathematics and astronomy, becoming the first astronomy professor for the university.

He was married to Fannie Shattuck, the daughter of the state superintendent of instruction, in 1884. The same year, he received his Sc.D. degree from the university with thesis work on solutions for the Kepler problem on orbit determination. In 1888, the university received a gift of $50,000 from Humphrey Chamberlin, an amateur astronomer, which Howe used to fund an observatory. Construction began in 1889, based around a 20 in (0.5 m) aperture lens that Howe purchased from Alvin Clarke & Sons. At the time of assembly, the refractor telescope was the fifth largest instrument of its kind in the United States. Howe was named director of the Chamberlin Observatory in 1892, and trial observations with the telescope began in July 1894.

Most of Howe's work at the observatory consisted of observations of neglected nebulae from the New General Catalogue, measurements of double stars, and positional work on comets and asteroids. In 1892, Howe was named the dean of the College of Liberal Arts, serving in this capacity until 1926. His work in this capacity limited the time he could spend on astronomy. In 1899, he served as the acting chancellor of the university. He received an LLD from Denver University in 1910, and a second LLD from Colorado College in 1913. By 1926 his health was starting to fail, so he began to train his eventual successor at the observatory, Albert Recht.

== Bibliography ==
- A study of the sky (1896)
- Elements of descriptive astronomy (1897)
