= Sergei Kostinsky =

- Сергей Константинович Костинский
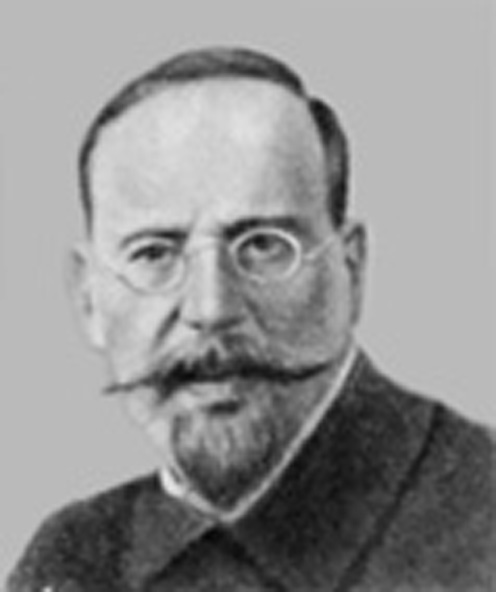
- Born: 12 August 1867; Moscow, Russia
- Died: 21 August 1936 (aged 69)
- Education: Moscow University
- Scientific career
- Fields: astronomy
- Workplaces: Pulkovo observatory Petrograd University

Sergei Konstantinovich Kostinsky (Russian: Сергей Константинович Костинский; 12 August 1867 – 21 August 1936) was a Russian and Soviet astronomer who worked on observational and photographic astronomical measurement techniques at the Pulkovo Observatory. The so-called Kostinsky Effect involving the merging of closely occurring stars on a photographic plate is named after him as are an asteroid and a crater on the Moon.

Kostinsky was born in Moscow, where he went to the local Gymnasium before studying at Moscow University under Fyodor Bredikhin and Vitold Tserasky. He followed Bredikhin to work at the Pulkovo observatory becoming supernumerary astronomer in 1890 and rising to senior astronomer in 1902. He began to work on astrophotography under Oskar Backlund from 1895 producing gelatin glass images which were used for making accurate measurements. This also involved travels to Germany, the Netherlands and France where he worked with Julius Scheiner, Max Wolf, Jacobus Kapteyn, Paul Henry and Prosper Henry. He obtained remarkable images of the solar corona during an eclipse in 1896 observed from Novaya Zemlya. He was also involved in accurate measurements of the arc of a meridian in 1899-1901 at Spitzbergen in collaboration with Swedish scientists. Kostinsky was also involved in training young astronomers and popularizing astronomy, teaching formally as a professor at the Petrograd University from 1919.
