= Mount Guyot (Colorado) =

Mountain in Colorado, United States

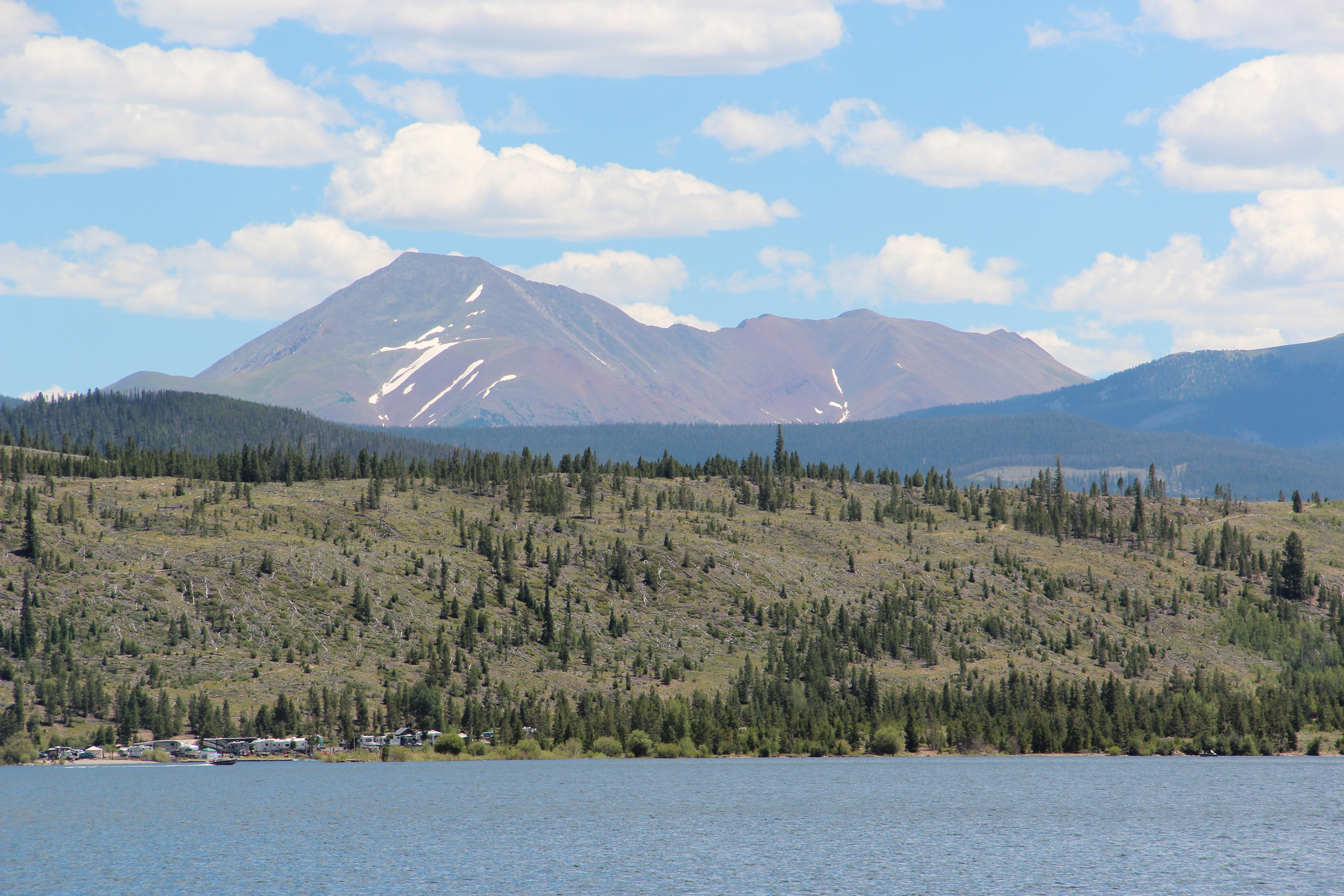
- Mount Guyot viewed from Dillon Reservoir

Highest point
- Elevation: 13,376 ft (4,077 m)
- Prominence: 1,324 ft (404 m)
- Isolation: 1.99 mi (3.20 km)
- Coordinates: 39°27′32″N 105°56′15″W

Naming
- Etymology: Arnold Henry Guyot

Geography
- Location within Colorado
- Location: Continental Divide between Park and Summit counties, Colorado, United States
- Parent range: Front Range
- Topo map(s): USGS 7.5' topographic map Grays Peak, Colorado

Mount Guyot is a high mountain summit in the Front Range of the Rocky Mountains of North America. The 13,376-foot (4,077 m) thirteener is located 6.3 miles (10.2 km) east-southeast (bearing 117°) of the Town of Breckenridge, Colorado, United States, on the Continental Divide separating Pike National Forest and Park County from Arapaho National Forest and Summit County. The mountain was named in honor of Arnold Henry Guyot, a Swiss-American geologist.

== See also ==
- List of Colorado mountain ranges
- List of Colorado mountain summits
  - List of Colorado fourteeners
  - List of Colorado 4000 meter prominent summits
  - List of the most prominent summits of Colorado
- List of Colorado county high points
