= Ibn Firnas (crater) =

Lunar impact crater

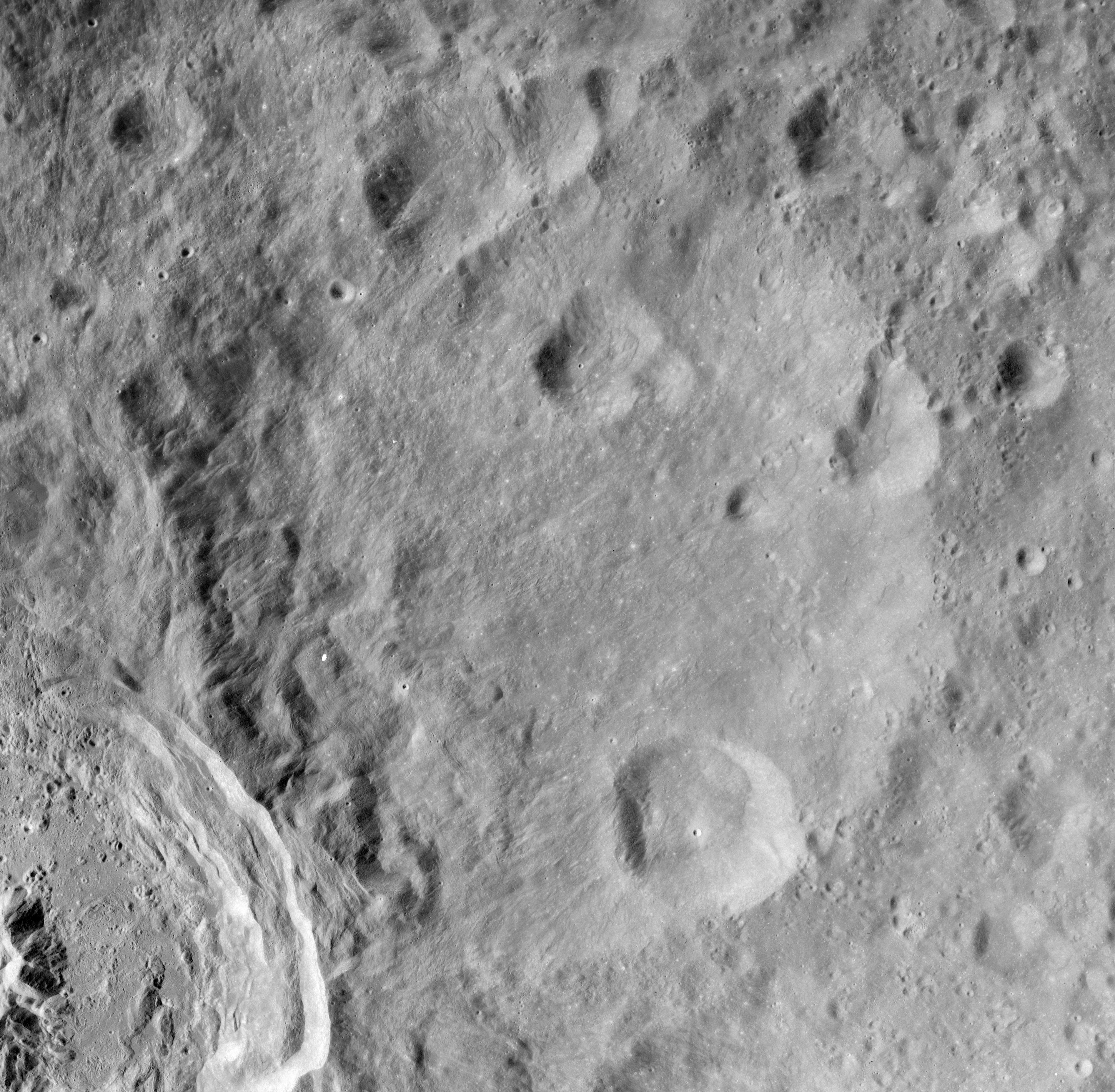
- Apollo 16 mapping camera image
- Coordinates: 6.8°N 122.3°E
- Diameter: 89 km
- Colongitude: 239° at sunrise
- Eponym: Abbas Ibn Firnas

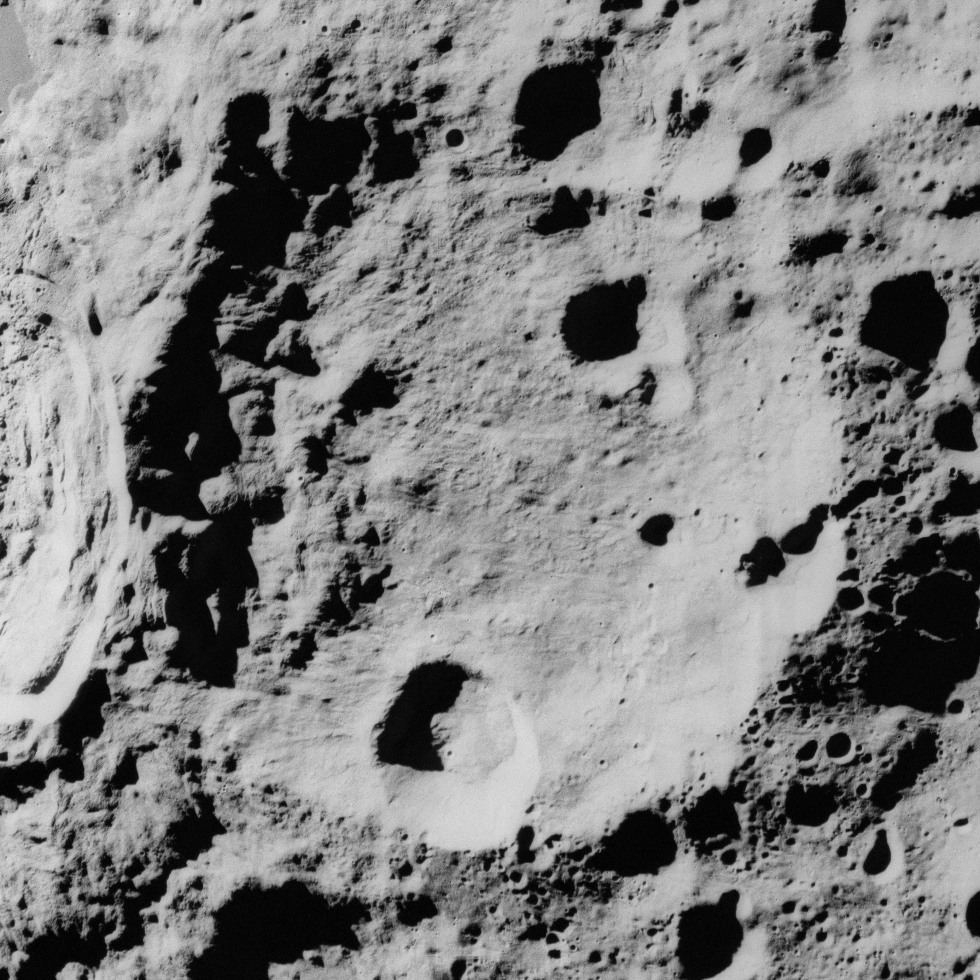
Oblique Apollo 16 mapping camera image at lower sun angle than above

Ibn Firnas is a lunar impact crater on the far side of the Moon. Attached to the exterior of its southwestern rim is the prominent crater King. Only a few kilometers to the north, separated by a rugged stretch of terrain, is the larger crater Ostwald.

Ibn Firnas is a worn and eroded crater with small impacts along the northern and eastern rims. The satellite crater Ibn Firnas L lies along the inner wall to the southeast and covers part of the interior floor. Along the northern side, the small satellite crater Ibn Firnas Y cuts through the rim and overlays part of the inner wall. The interior floor is irregular along the northern and southwest sections where their shape has been modified by the large nearby craters mentioned above. Several small craters lie across the remainder of the interior floor.

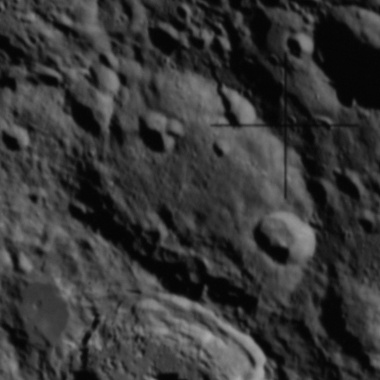
Oblique Apollo 14 Hasselblad camera image

In 1976 the crater was named by the IAU after Abbas Ibn Firnas, a polymath from Andalucia who, in the 9th century, devised a chain of rings that could be used to simulate the motions of the planets and stars. Prior to 1976, this crater was known as Crater 213.

== Nearby craters ==
Several small craters located in the rugged terrain at the northern edge of this crater have been assigned names by the IAU. These are listed in the table below.

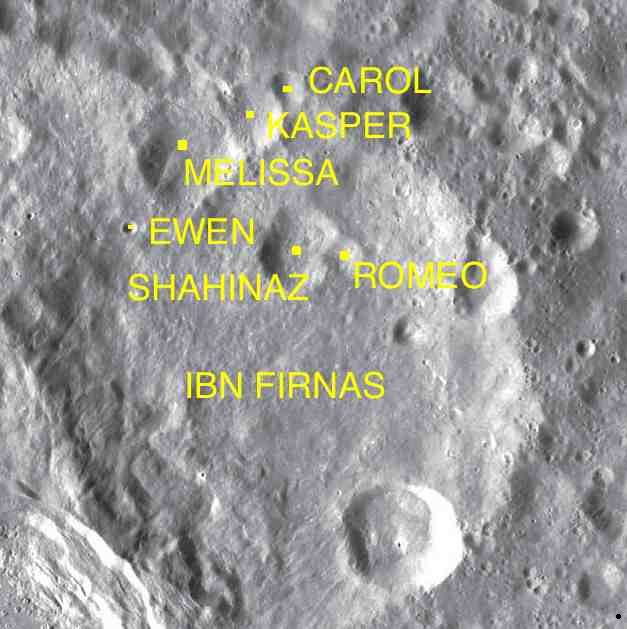
Several small craters in the north of the Ibn Firnas crater area

Crater	Coordinates	Diameter	Name source
Carol	8.5°N 122.3°E	8 km	Latin feminine name
Ewen	7.7°N 121.4°E	3 km	Gaelic masculine name
Kasper	8.3°N 122.1°E	12 km	Polish masculine name
Melissa	8.1°N 121.8°E	18 km	Greek feminine name
Romeo	7.5°N 122.6°E	8 km	Italian masculine name
Shahinaz	7.5°N 122.4°E	15 km	Persian feminine name

The crater Melissa lies across the north-northwestern outer rim of Ibn Firnas. It is a roughly bowl-shaped, although it has a very uneven appearance due to the irregular terrain in which it was formed. Melissa was previously designated Ibn Firnas Y before it was assigned a name by the IAU.

The locations of these craters are shown on the following L&PI topographic maps:

- LTO-65B4 Recht
- LTO-65C1 King

== Satellite craters ==
By convention these features are identified on lunar maps by placing the letter on the side of the crater midpoint that is closest to Ibn Firnas.

Ibn Firnas	Latitude	Longitude	Diameter
E	7.5° N	125.5° E	42 km
L	5.9° N	123.0° E	21 km

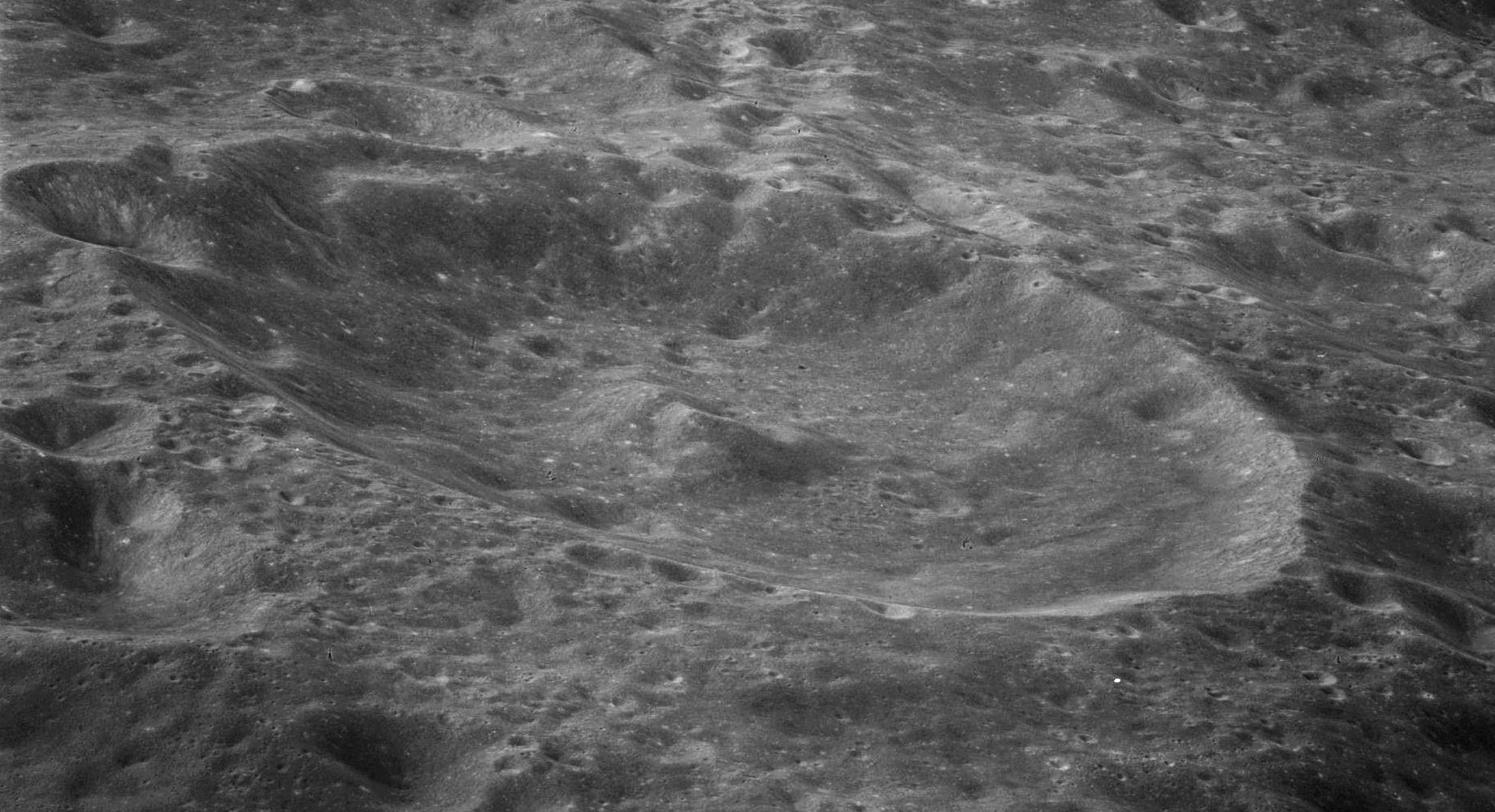
Oblique view of Ibn Firnas E from Apollo 10
