= Arnold Henry Guyot =

Swiss-American geologist and geographer (1807-1884)

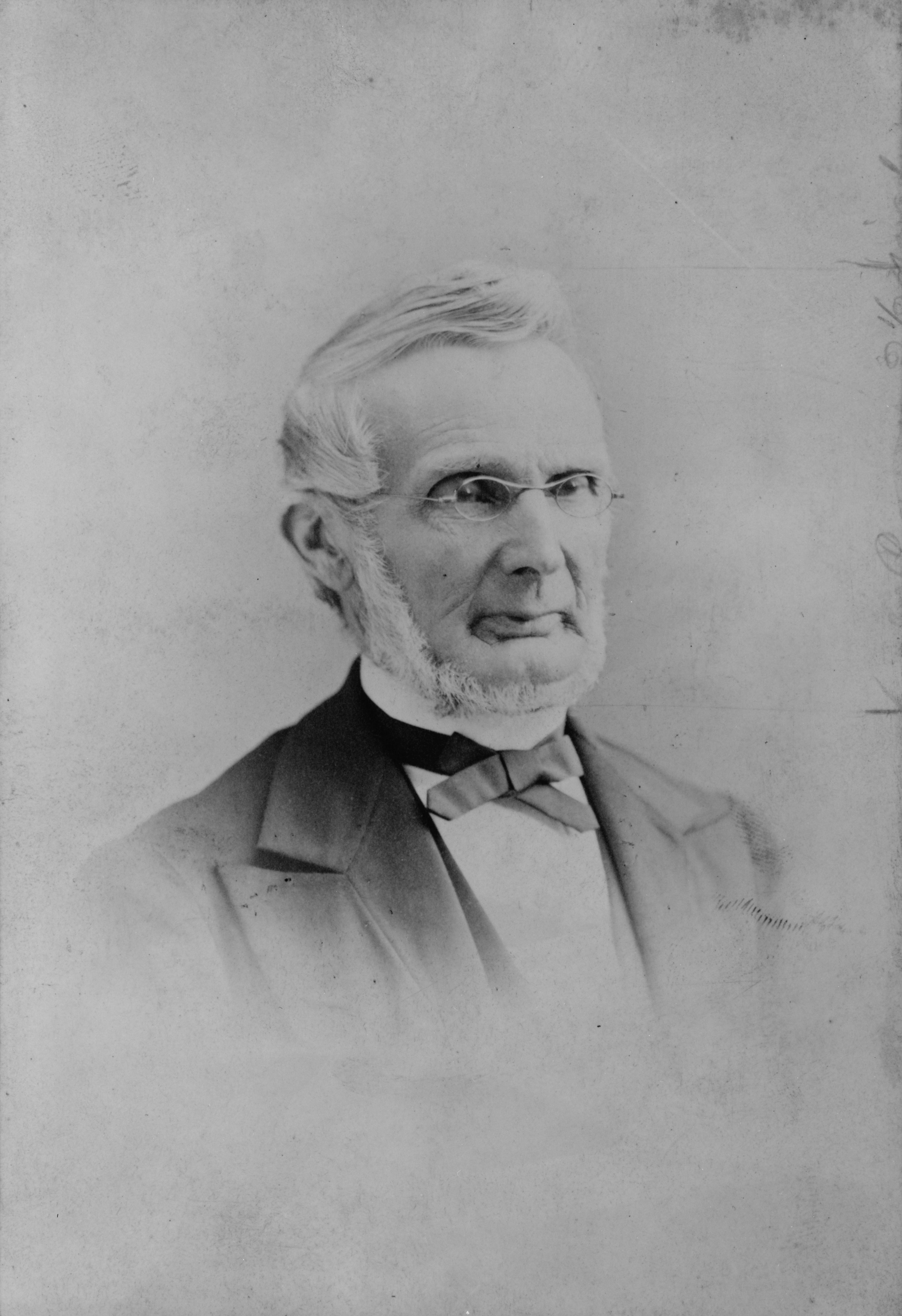
- Arnold Henry Guyot
- Born: September 28, 1807; Boudevilliers, Canton of Neuchâtel, Switzerland
- Died: February 8, 1884 (aged 76); Princeton, New Jersey, United States
- Citizenship: American
- Scientific career
- Fields: geology geography

Arnold Henry Guyot (English: /ɡiːˈjoʊ/ ghee-YOH, French: [aʁnɔld ɑ̃ʁi gɥijo]; September 28, 1807 – February 8, 1884) was a Swiss-American geologist and geographer.

== Early life ==
Guyot was born on September 28, 1807, at Boudevilliers, near Neuchâtel, Switzerland. He was educated at Chaux-de-Fonds, then at the college of Neuchâtel. In 1825, he went to Germany and resided in Karlsruhe where he met Louis Agassiz, the beginning of a lifelong friendship. From Karlsruhe he moved to Stuttgart, where he studied at the gymnasium. He returned to Neuchâtel in 1827. He determined to enter the ministry and started at the University of Berlin to attend lectures. While pursuing his studies, he also attended lectures on philosophy and natural science. His leisure time was spent in collecting shells and plants, and he received an entrée to the Berlin Botanical Garden from Alexander von Humboldt. In 1835, he received a PhD from Berlin.

== Scientific career ==
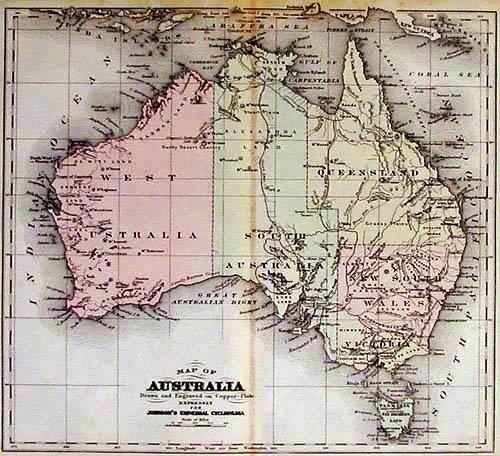
Australia map compiled by Arnold Henry Guyot and Frederick Augustus Porter Barnard

In 1838, at Agassiz's suggestion, he visited the Swiss glaciers and communicated the results of his six-week investigation to the Geological Society of France. He was the first to point out certain important observations relating to glacial motion and structure. Among other things he noted the more rapid flow of the center than of the sides, and the more rapid flow of the top than of the bottom of glaciers; described the laminated or ribboned structure of the glacial ice; and ascribed the movement of glaciers to a gradual molecular displacement rather than to a sliding of the ice mass as held by Horace Bénédict de Saussure. He subsequently collected important data concerning erratic boulders.

In 1839, he became the colleague of Agassiz as professor of history and physical geography at the College of Neuchâtel (a.k.a. Neuchâtel Academy). The suspension of that institution in 1848 caused Guyot to emigrate, at Agassiz's instance, to the United States, where he settled in Cambridge, Massachusetts. He delivered a course of lectures at the Lowell Institute which were afterward published as Earth and Man (Boston 1849). For several years the Massachusetts Board of Education retained his services as a lecturer on geography and methods of instruction to the normal schools and teachers' institutes.

He was occupied with this work until his appointment, in 1854, as professor of physical geography and geology at Princeton University, which office he retained until his death. He was also for several years lecturer on physical geography in the State Normal School in Trenton, New Jersey, and from 1861 to 1866 lecturer in the Princeton Theological Seminary. He also gave courses in the Union Theological Seminary, New York, and at Columbia College. He founded the museum at Princeton (now closed), many of the specimens of which came from his own collections. He was elected as a member to the American Philosophical Society in 1867.

His scientific work in the United States included the perfection of plans for a national system of meteorological observations. Most of these were conducted under the auspices of the Smithsonian Institution. His extensive meteorological observations led to the establishment of the United States Weather Bureau, and his Meteorological and Physical Tables (1852, revised ed. 1884) were long standard.

Guyot rejected Darwin's theory of human evolution and, at the same time, he accepted Hugh Miller's views on the book of Genesis, thinking that the days described there might have taken a longer period of time. Scientist James Dwight Dana described Guyot as "a fervently religious man, living as if ever in communion with his Heavenly Parent; a Christian, following closely in the footsteps of his Master." Guyot's Creation, or the Biblical Cosmogony in the Light of Modern Science (1884) was critically reviewed in the Science journal.

== Death ==
Guyot died on February 8, 1884, at Princeton, New Jersey.

== Works ==
His graded series of text books and wall maps were important aids in the extension and popularization of geological study in America. In addition to text books, his principal publications were:

- Earth and Man, Lectures on Comparative Physical Geography in its Relation to the History of Mankind (translated by Cornelius Conway Felton, 1849)
- A Memoir of Louis Agassiz (1883)
- Creation, or the Biblical Cosmogony in the Light of Modern Science (1884)
- Johnson's New Universal Cyclopaedia (1876) - editor-in-chief along with Frederick Augustus Porter Barnard

Guyot's Earth and Man lecture series describes how geography—particularly the distribution of continents, topography, and climate regions—determines the superiority or inferiority of human races in terms of beauty, physical ability, intelligence, and morality. Through these lectures, Guyot promulgated theories of scientific racism to a wide audience in New England, including the general public and teachers who were eager to incorporate this material into their classes. Guyot is estimated to have reached about 1,500 teachers during this tour.

== Legacy ==
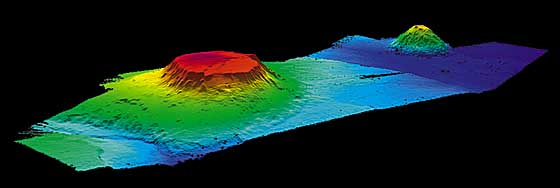
The Bear Seamount, a guyot

He is the namesake of several geographical features, including Guyot Glacier in Alaska, The Guyot Crater, Mount Guyot on the North Carolina and Tennessee border, Mount Guyot in New Hampshire, Mount Guyot on the Rocky Mountain Continental Divide in Colorado, as well as a Mount Guyot just southwest of Mount Whitney in California.

The building housing the Department of Ecology and Evolutionary Biology and the Department of Geosciences at Princeton is named Guyot Hall in his honor. In turn the term "guyot"—an isolated underwater volcanic mountain (seamount), with a flat top—was coined by Harry Hammond Hess and named after the eponymous building.
