= Katchalsky (crater) =

Crater on the Moon

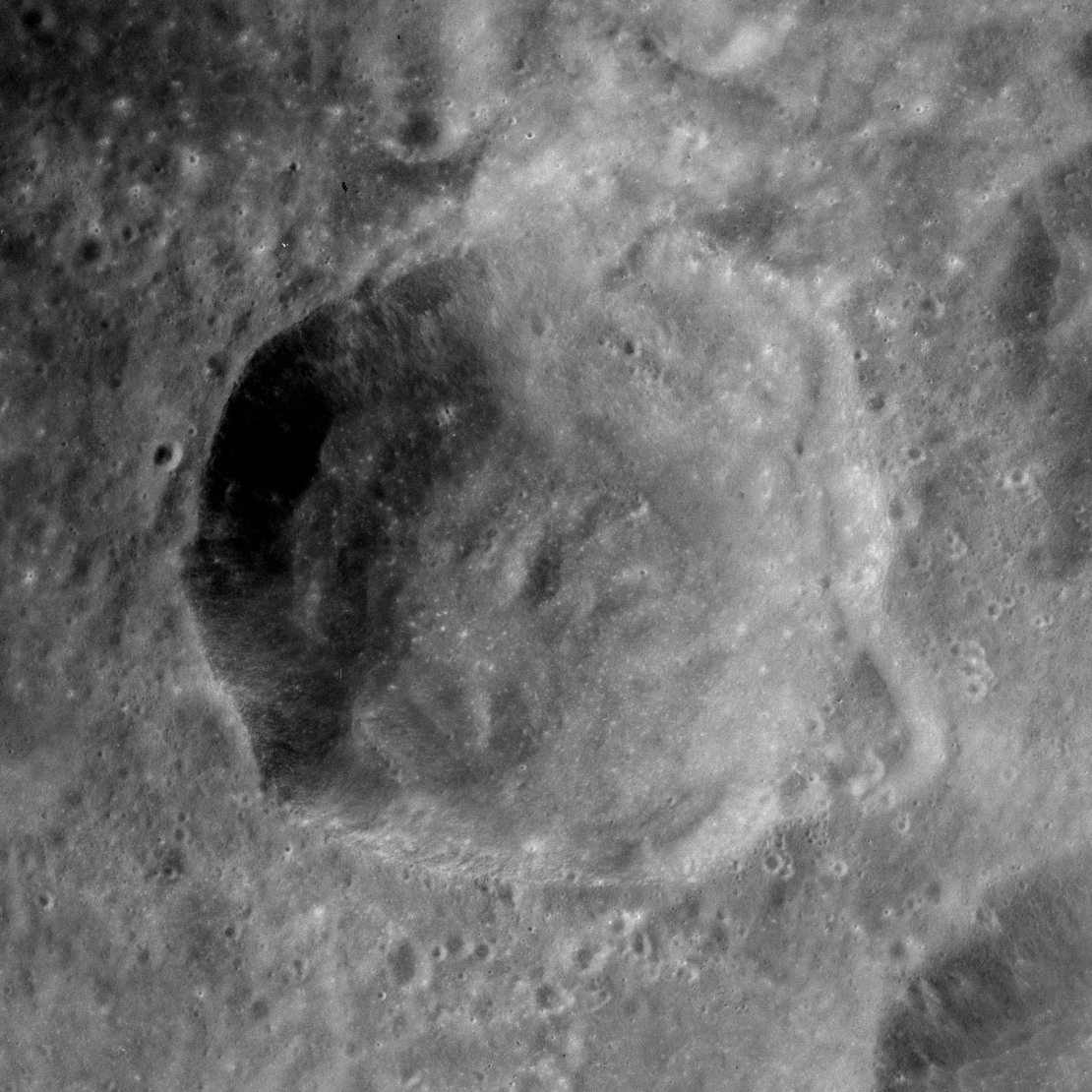
- Apollo 16 Mapping camera image
- Coordinates: 5.9°N 116.1°E
- Diameter: 32 km
- Depth: 3 km
- Colongitude: 245° at sunrise
- Eponym: Aharon Katzir-Katchalsky

Katchalsky is a crater that lies on the far side of the Moon. It was named after scientist Aharon Katzir-Katchalsky. It lies to the southeast of the larger crater Lobachevskiy, and to the west of the prominent King. Less than a half-crater diameter to the southeast of Katchalsky is Viviani.

The outer rim of Katchalsky is not quite circular, with outward bulges to the east and north, giving it a flat side along the northeastern edge. The rim is not markedly eroded, and the interior contains only a few tiny craterlets.
