= Viviani (crater) =

Crater on the Moon

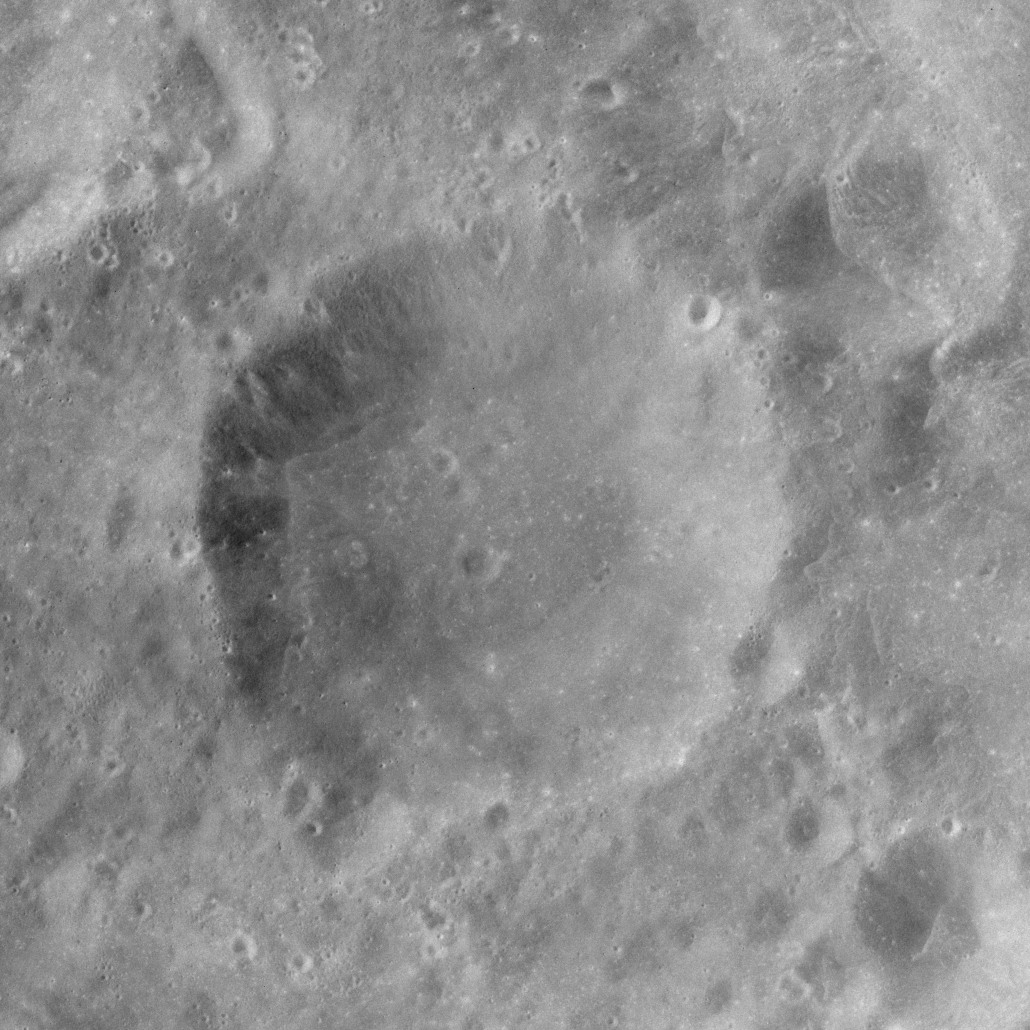
- Apollo 16 Mapping camera image
- Coordinates: 5.2°N 117.1°E
- Diameter: 26 km
- Depth: 2.3 km
- Colongitude: 243° at sunrise
- Eponym: Vincenzo Viviani

Viviani is a small lunar impact crater that lies on the far side of the Moon. It was named after Italian mathematician and physicist Vincenzo Viviani. It is located due west of the prominent crater King, and just to the southeast of Katchalsky.

This is a roughly circular, bowl-shaped crater with a well-defined rim edge and an inner wall that is wider along the southeastern half. A small crater has cut into the southern rim edge, and another small crater is attached to the exterior along the east. The inner walls are simple slopes that run down to the relatively level and featureless floor.

== Satellite craters ==
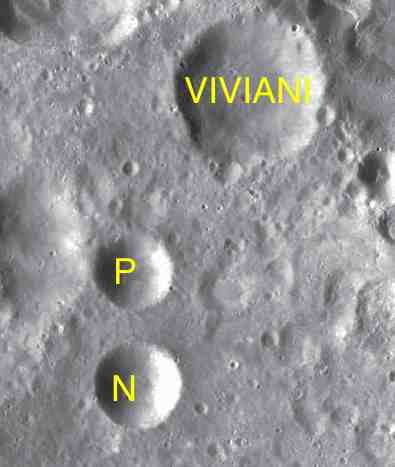
Viviani and its satellite craters

By convention these features are identified on lunar maps by placing the letter on the side of the crater midpoint that is closest to Viviani.

Viviani	Latitude	Longitude	Diameter
N	3.5° N	116.5° E	16 km
P	4.1° N	116.5° E	15 km

== In popular culture ==
Viviani, along with another crater, Bingham, is referenced in the Midsomer Murders season 14 episode 'Dark Secrets'.
