= Camille Recht =

German writer, critic and editor

Camille Recht was a German writer, critic and editor. Recht wrote the introduction to the Eugène Atget monograph Lichtbilder and edited a collection of nineteenth century photography Die Alte Photographie.
