= Guyot (crater) =

Crater on the Moon

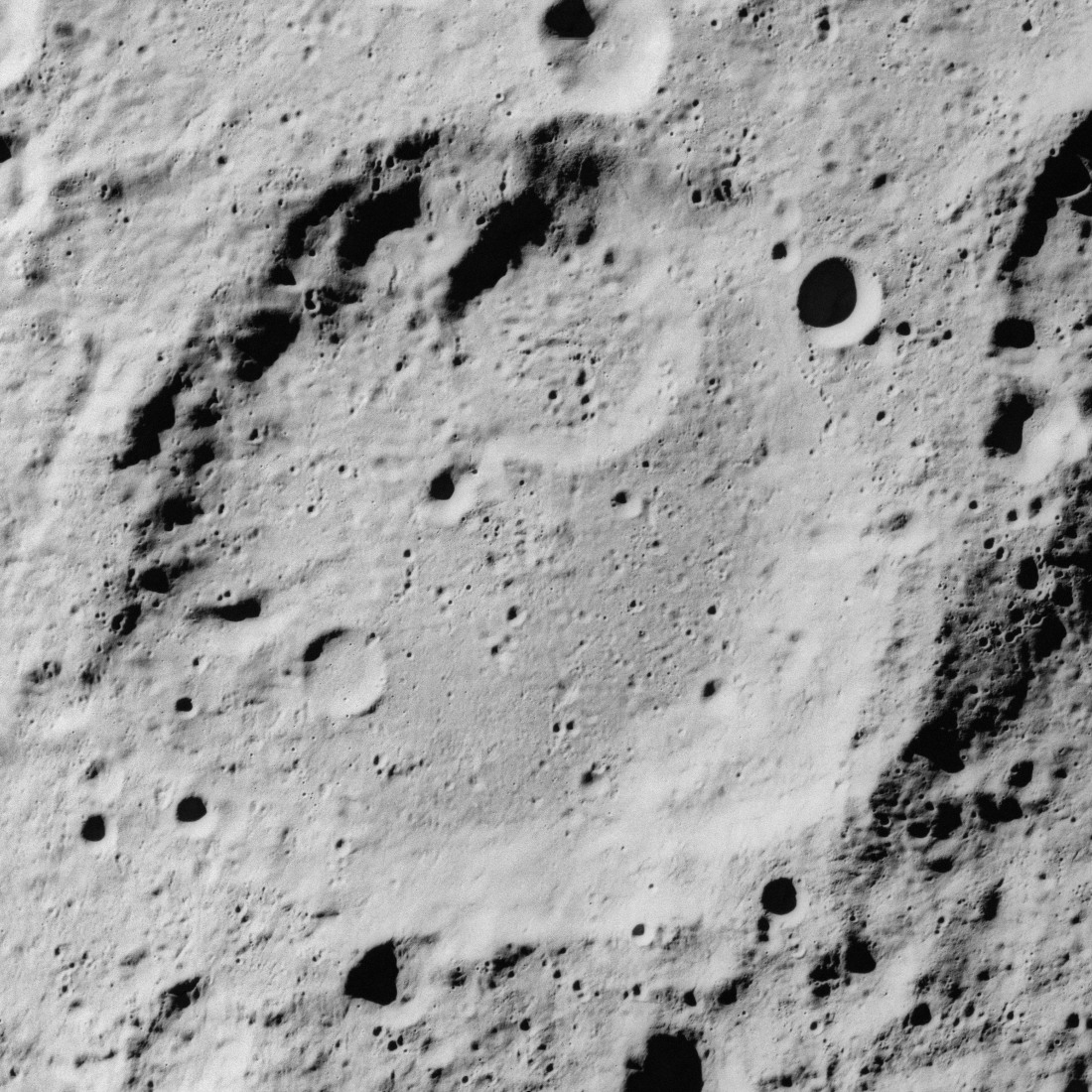
- Apollo 16 mapping camera image (north is in upper right)
- Coordinates: 11.4°N 117.5°E
- Diameter: 92 km
- Colongitude: 244° at sunrise
- Eponym: Arnold H. Guyot

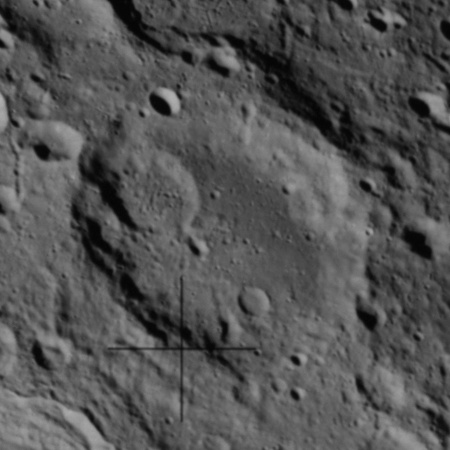
Oblique Apollo 14 image

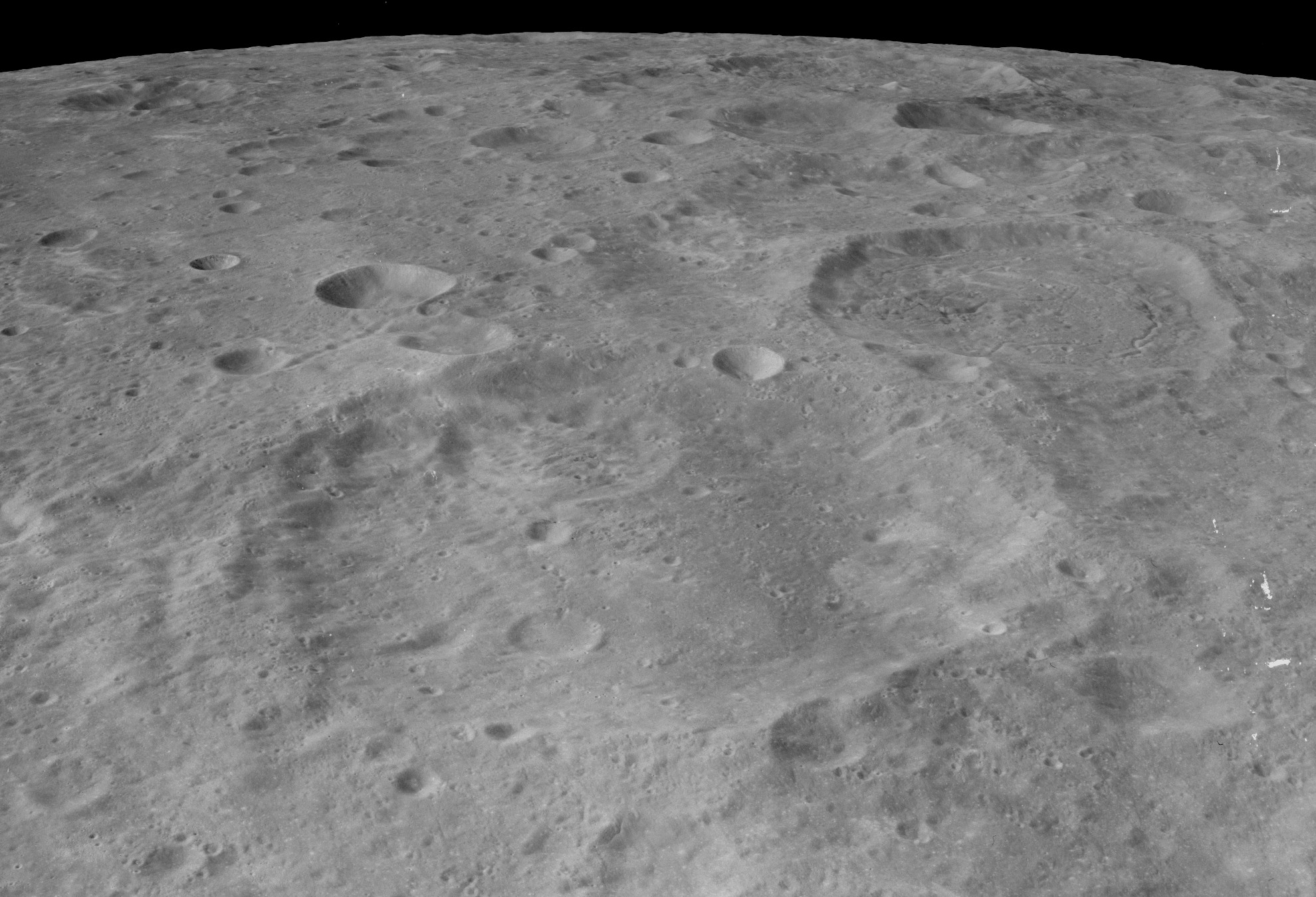
Oblique view of Guyot (center foreground) and Kostinskiy (right of center), from Apollo 16

Guyot (English: /ɡiːˈjoʊ/ ghee-YOH, French: [ɡɥijo]) is a lunar impact crater on the Moon's far side. It is separated from the crater Kostinskiy to the northeast by only a few kilometers of rough terrain. To the west-southwest lies the crater Lobachevskiy and to the east-southeast is Ostwald.

This is a worn and eroded crater with an outer rim that has been somewhat distorted in shape due to nearby impacts. Several small craterlets lie along the rim and the sides. The interior floor has also been marked by impacts, including an eroded formation occupying the northwestern portion.

The crater is named after the Swiss-born American geographer and geologist Arnold Henry Guyot. Prior to naming in 1970 by the IAU, this crater was known as Crater 208.

== Satellite craters ==
By convention these features are identified on lunar maps by placing the letter on the side of the crater midpoint that is closest to Guyot.

Guyot	Latitude	Longitude	Diameter
J	8.3° N	119.6° E	14 km
K	8.3° N	118.7° E	14 km
W	14.0° N	115.5° E	21 km
