= Recht (crater) =

Crater on the Moon

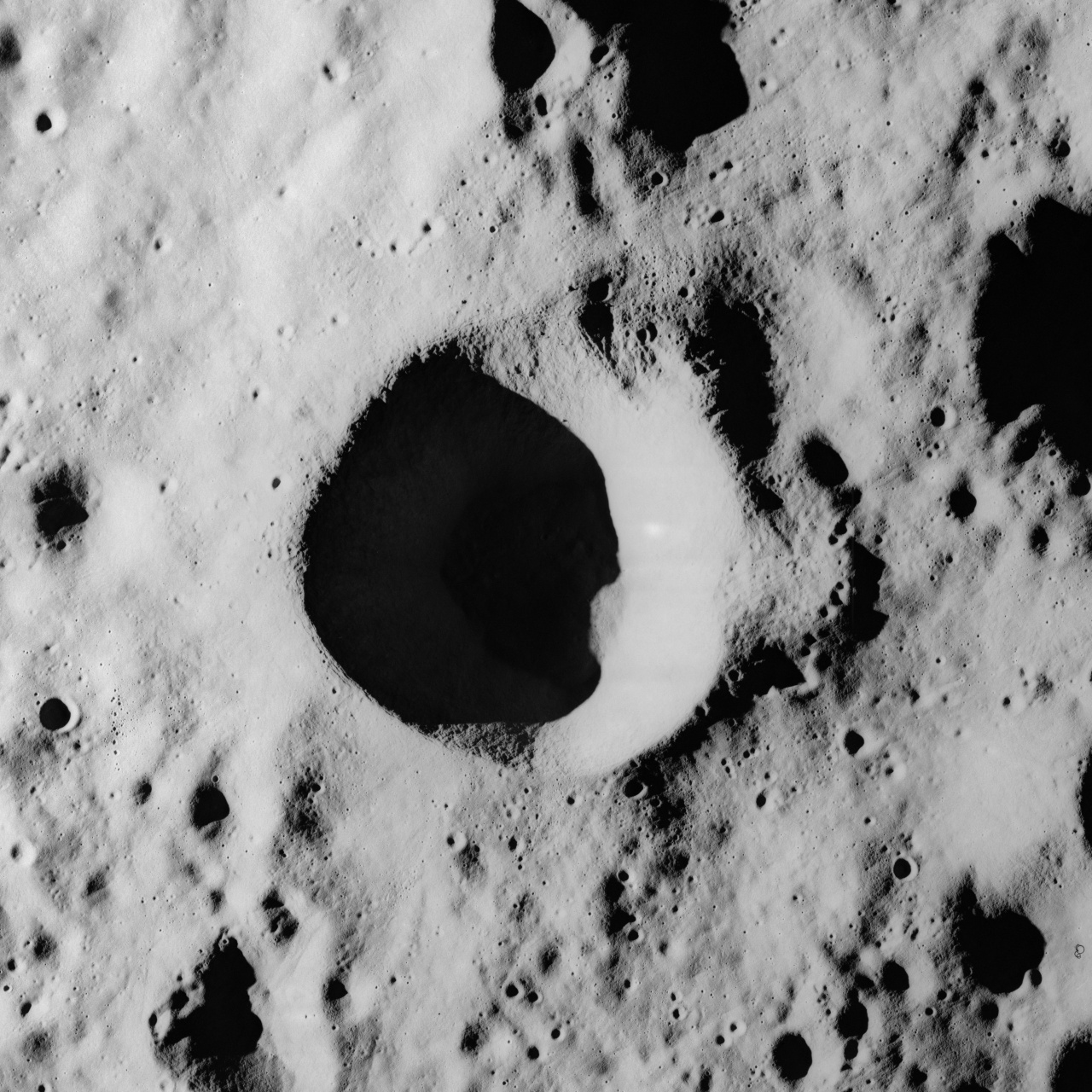
- Apollo 16 mapping camera image
- Coordinates: 9.8°N 124.0°E
- Diameter: 20 km
- Depth: 2.5 km
- Colongitude: 236° at sunrise
- Eponym: Albert W. Recht

Recht is a small impact crater on the far side of the Moon. It was named after the American mathematician and astronomer Albert William Recht. It lies across the eastern rim of the much larger crater Ostwald. To the northeast of Recht is Meshcherskiy.

This is a bowl-shaped formation with an interior floor that is less than half the diameter of the crater. The inner walls have a higher albedo than the surrounding terrain, while the interior floor is about the same shade of grey.

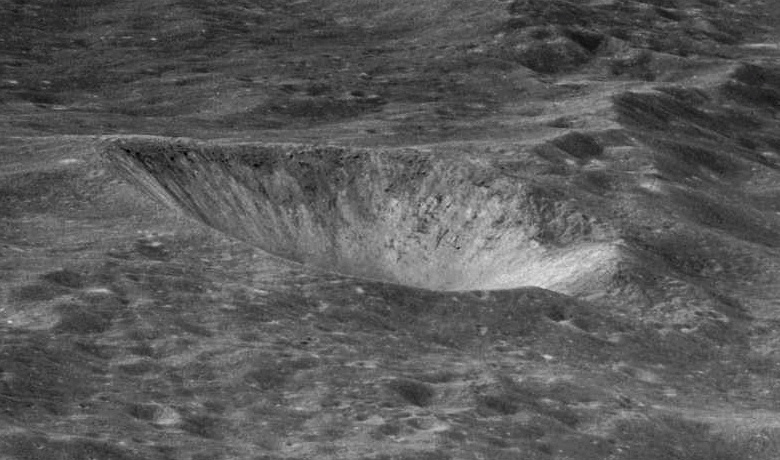
Oblique view from Apollo 10

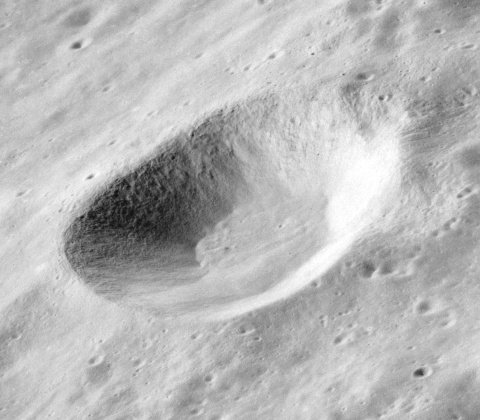
Oblique view from Apollo 16

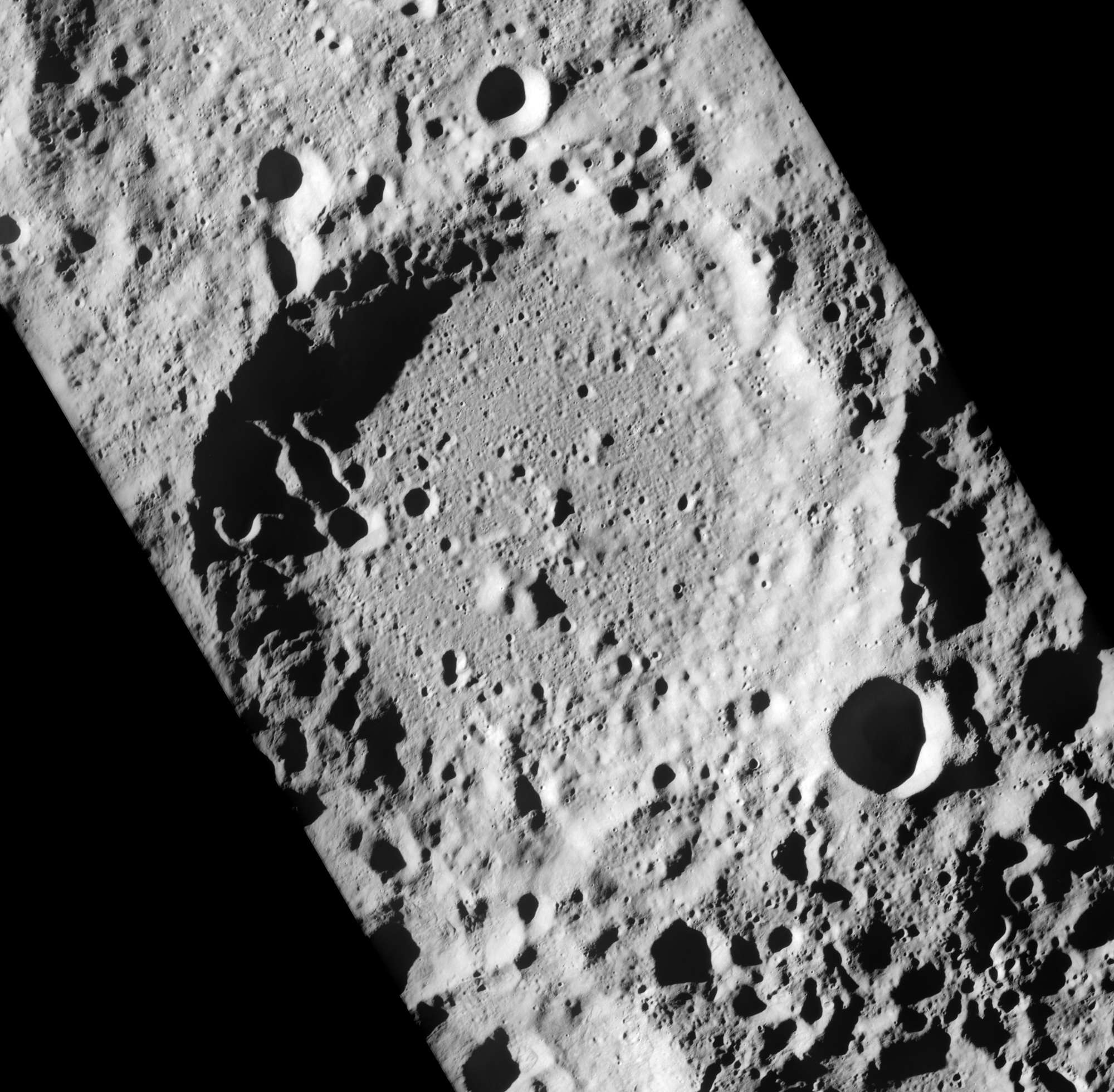
Apollo 16 panoramic camera image of Ostwald crater, with Recht at lower right
