= Chamberlin Observatory =

Observatory in Denver, Colorado, US

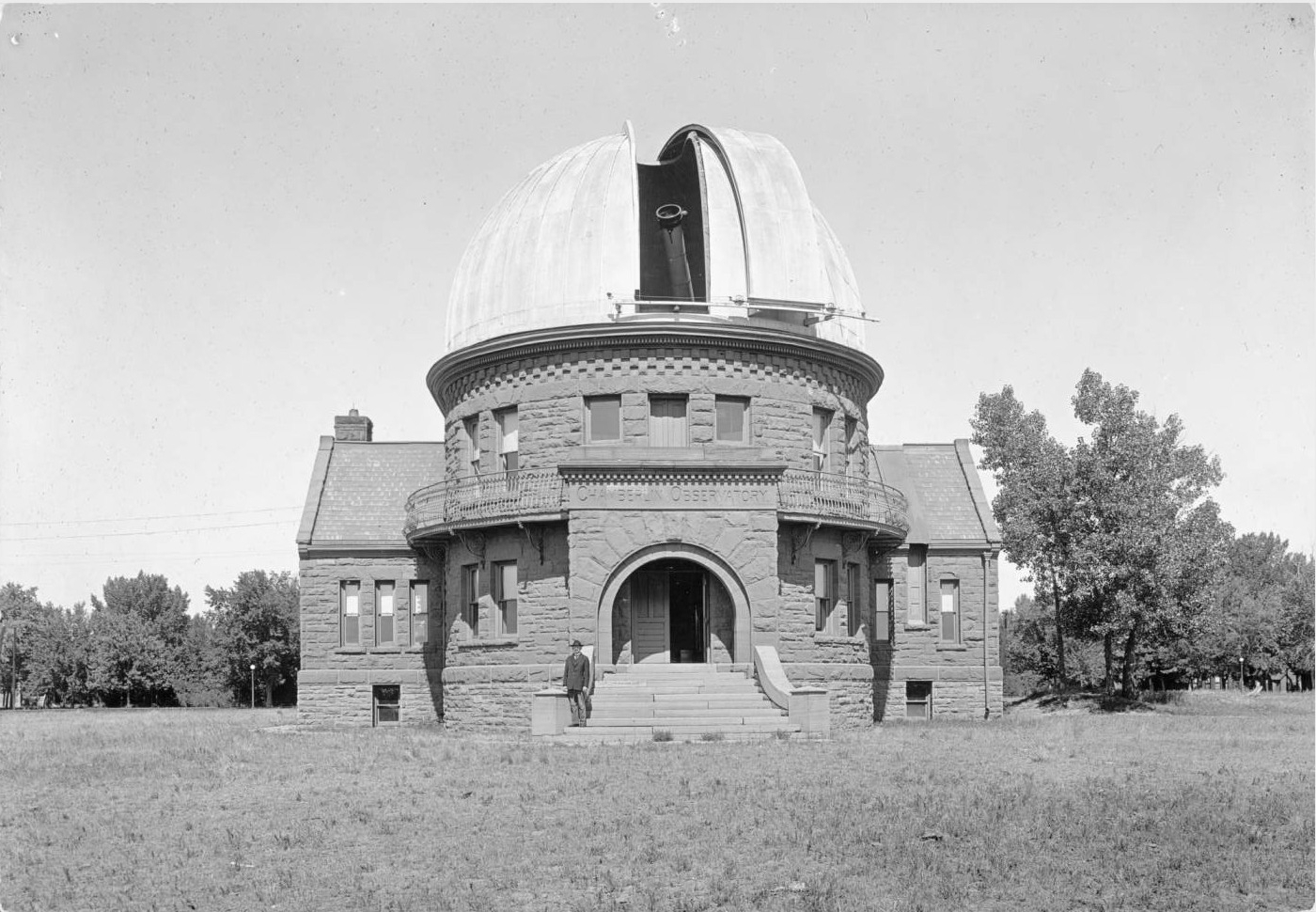
- Chamberlin Observatory, circa 1900
- Organization: University of Denver
- Observatory code: 708
- Location: 2930 E. Warren Ave., Denver, Colorado, U.S.
- Coordinates: 39°40′34″N 104°57′11″W
- Altitude: 1,651 m (5,417 ft)
- Weather: See the Clear Sky Chart
- Established: 1890
- Website: mysite.du.edu/~rstencel/Chamberlin/

Telescopes
- Alvan Clark-George N. Saegmuller: 20-inch aperture, f/15 refractor
- Chamberlin Observatory
- U.S. National Register of Historic Places
- Colorado State Register of Historic Properties
- Location within Colorado Location within the United States
- Location: 2930 E. Warren Ave., Denver, Colorado
- Coordinates: 39°40′34″N 104°57′11″W
- Built: 1891
- Architect: Robert S. Roeschlaub
- Architectural style: Romanesque, Richardsonian Romanesque
- NRHP reference No.: 80000887
- CSRHP No.: 5DV.187
- Added to NRHP: March 27, 1980
- Related media on Commons

Chamberlin Observatory is an astronomical observatory owned and operated by the University of Denver. It is located in Denver, Colorado, US, in Observatory Park. It is named for Humphrey B. Chamberlin, a Denver real estate magnate who pledged $50,000 in 1888 to build and equip the facility.

The observatory building was designed by Robert S. Roeschlaub, with the astronomical aspects and functions designed by Professor Herbert Alonzo Howe after he visited many observatories in the east. It was modeled after the Goodsell Observatory at Carleton College in Northfield, Minnesota, and constructed from rusticated red sandstone blocks. The Romanesque structure includes a central rotunda and domed roof. Construction began in 1890.

The 20-inch objective lens for the observatory's main refracting telescope was made by Alvan Clark & Sons, and the mount was built by George Nicholas Saegmuller. The mount rests on a cast iron pillar which is in turn supported by a massive stone pier. Assembly of the telescope was supervised by Professor Herbert Alonzo Howe. The telescope saw first light in 1894.

As of 2018, the Denver Astronomical Society hosts several public outreach events at the observatory every month. As it is located in a large metropolitan area, the observatory is heavily affected by light pollution, which limits its use in scientific research.

The observatory was built during the golden era of great refractors in the late 19th century. The discovery of the Moons of Mars in 1877 using a 26-inch refractor, and several failed reflector projects, contributed to the popularity of refractor telescopes at that time. However, this era only lasted for ten years before the shift toward big reflectors occurred.

== See also ==
- List of observatories
- List of largest optical refracting telescopes
- List of the largest optical telescopes in North America (1900s section)
