= Ostwald (crater) =

Crater on the Moon

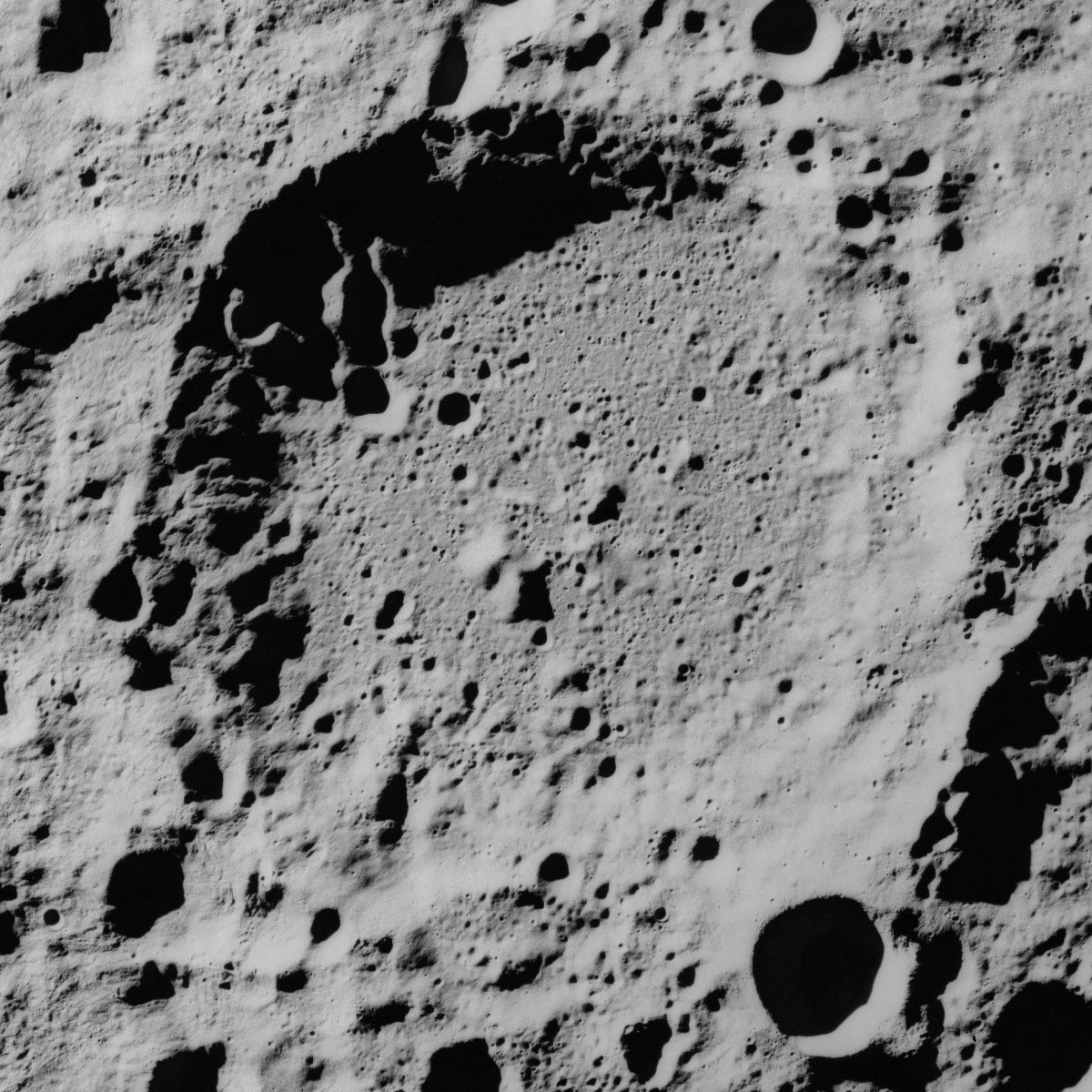
- Apollo 16 mapping camera image (north is in upper right)
- Coordinates: 10.4°N 121.9°E
- Diameter: 104 km
- Depth: 3.9 km
- Colongitude: 239° at sunrise
- Eponym: Wilhelm Ostwald

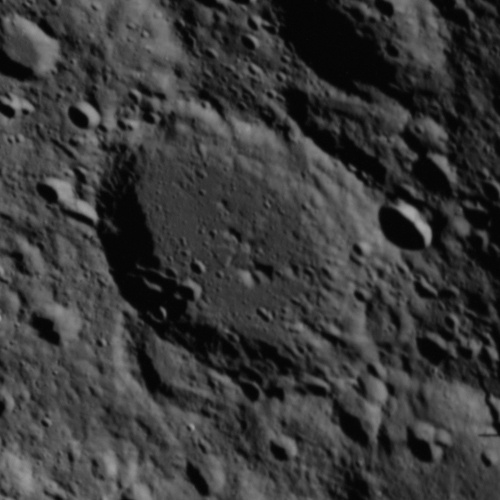
Oblique Apollo 14 Hasselblad camera image

Ostwald is a lunar impact crater on the far side of the Moon. It lies just to the east of the crater Guyot, and near the northern border of Ibn Firnas. Recht lies along its eastern rim.

This is a worn and eroded crater formation with an irregular rim and inner wall due to multiple small impacts. A brief crater chain forms a cleft in the western inner face. The interior is somewhat more level, but is pock-marked by a multitude of tiny craterlets. There are some low central ridges to the south and northeast of the midpoint.

The crater is named after German chemist and Nobel laureate Wilhelm Ostwald. Prior to naming in 1970 by the IAU, this crater was known as Crater 212.

== Satellite craters ==
By convention these features are identified on lunar maps by placing the letter on the side of the crater midpoint that is closest to Ostwald.

Ostwald	Latitude	Longitude	Diameter
Y	13.6° N	121.0° E	24 km
