= Lobachevskiy (crater) =

Lunar impact crater

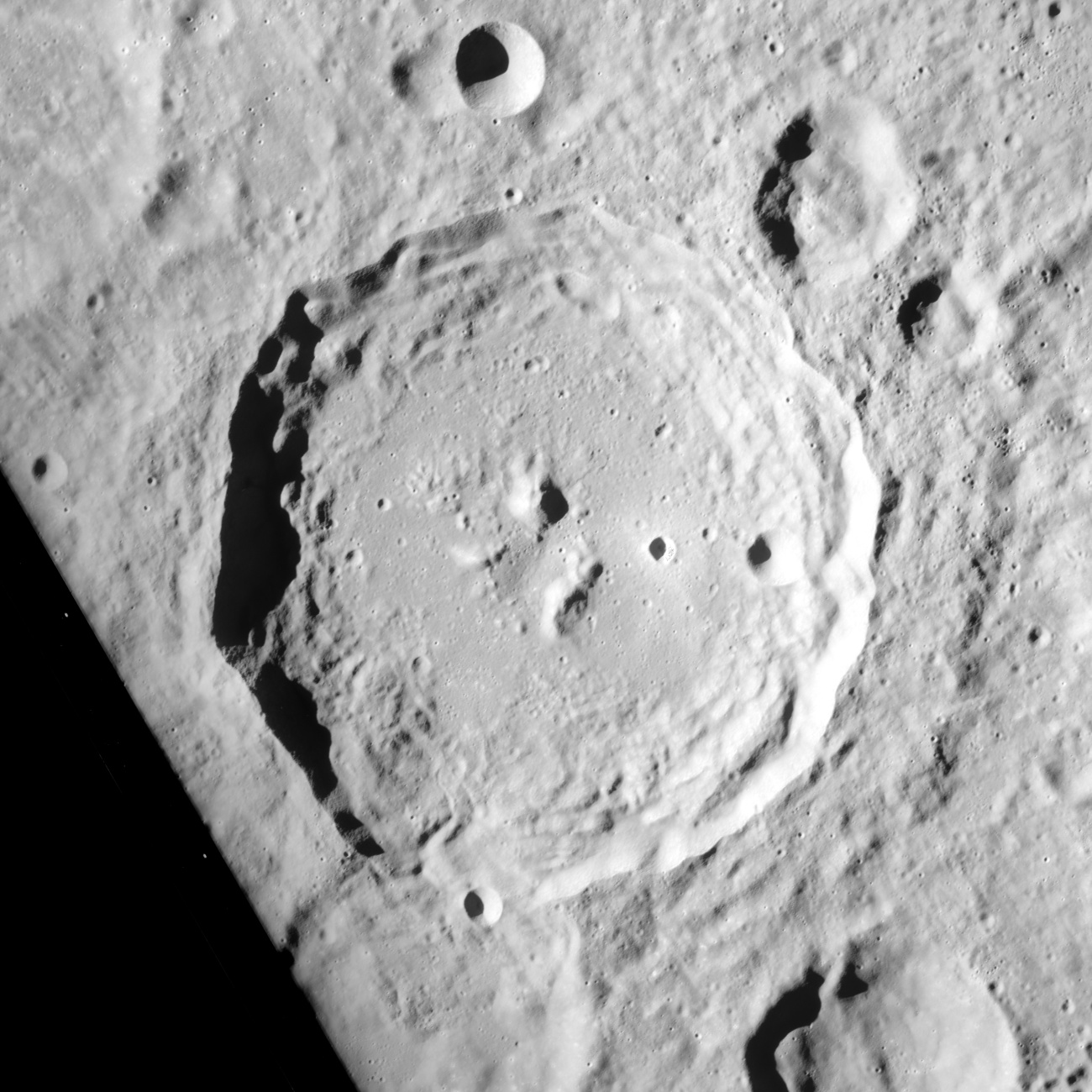
- Apollo 16 panoramic camera image (rotated so that north is at top)
- Coordinates: 9.9°N 112.6°E
- Diameter: 84 km
- Colongitude: 238° at sunrise
- Eponym: Nikolai Lobachevsky

Lobachevskiy is a lunar impact crater that is located on the far side of the Moon, beyond the eastern limb. It was named after Russian mathematician Nikolai Lobachevsky in 1961. This crater lies to the southeast of the larger crater Fleming. Less than a crater diameter to the east-northeast lies Guyot.

This formation dates to the Late Imbrian epoch of the lunar geologic timescale. It is a well-formed crater with features that have not been significantly eroded since Lobachevskiy was first formed. The rim and inner wall are nearly free of significant overlapping impacts, although the satellite crater Lobachevskiy M is attached to the southern outer rim. The inner walls display terrace features, along with some slumping along the upper edge.

Near the midpoint of the interior floor is a pair of central peaks, with one to the southeast and the other to the northwest of the middle.The infrared spectrum of pure crystalline plagioclase has been identified on these rises. To the east of these peaks is a relatively bright, high-albedo patch that is most likely the result of a recent small impact.

Two dark ribbons of material apparently emanate from the base of a small crater in the western wall of Lobachevskiy, and this was observed on the Apollo 16 mission.

Prior to 1961 this crater was known as Crater 205.

== Views ==
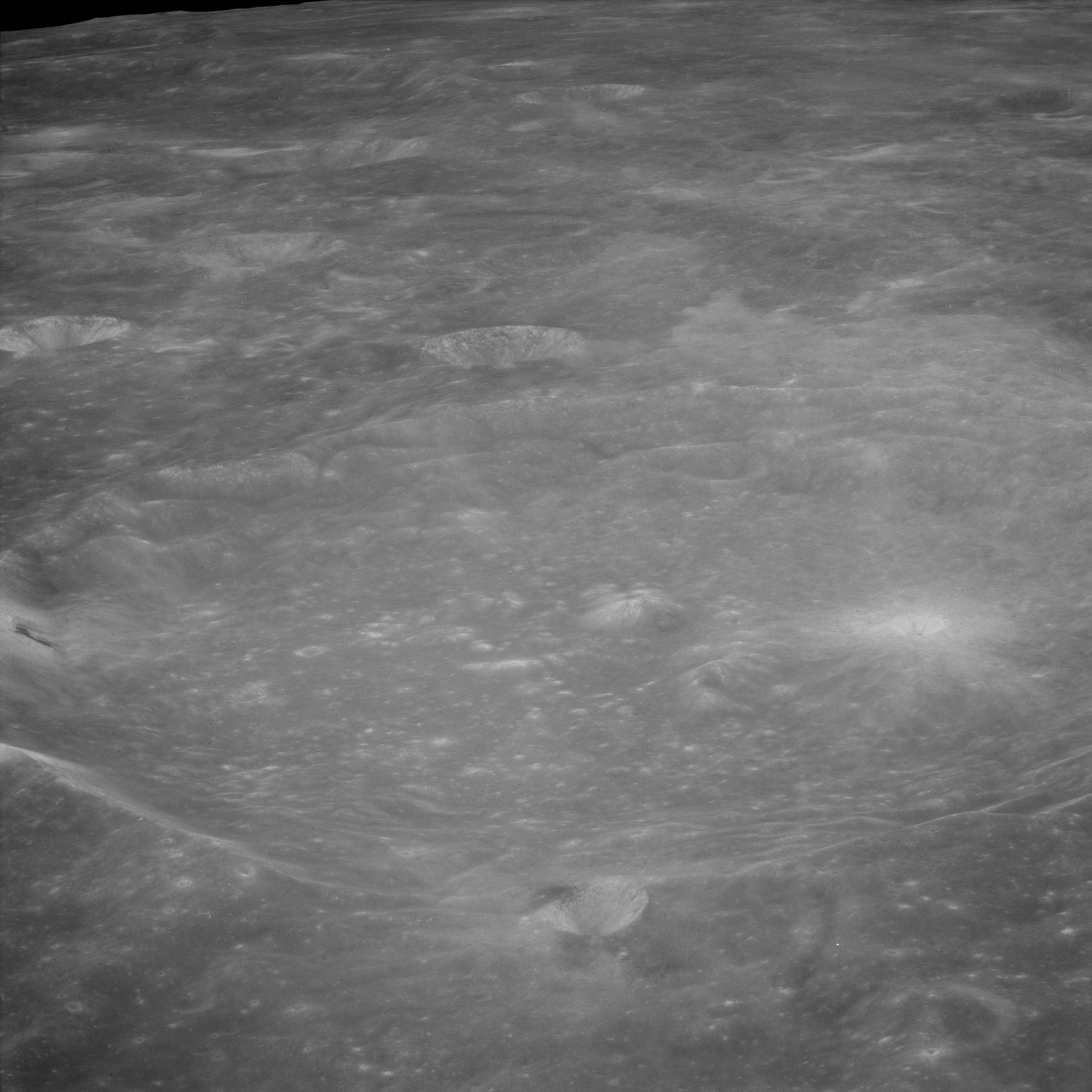
Low-altitude oblique close-up from Apollo 11

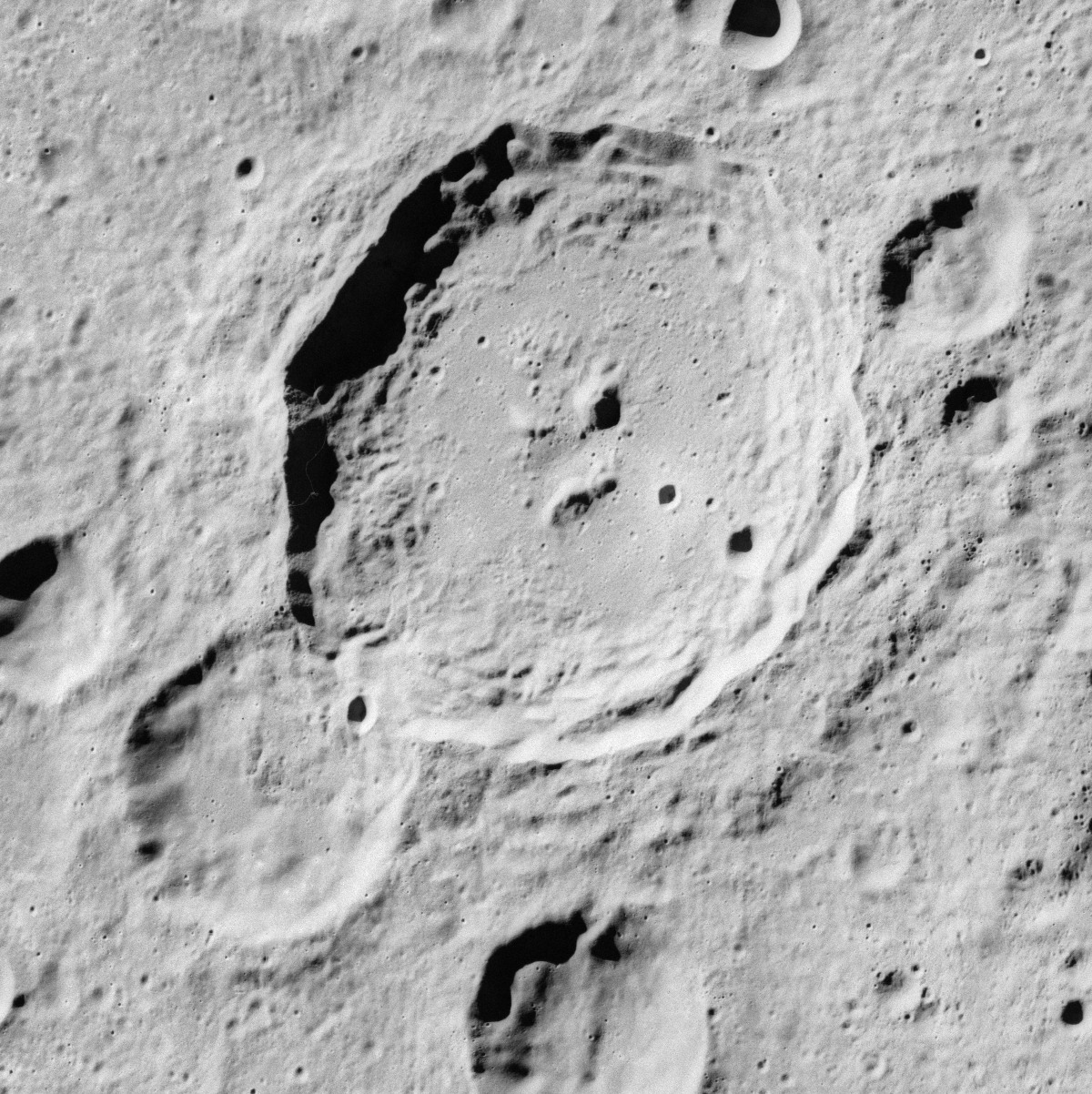
Oblique Apollo 16 mapping camera image

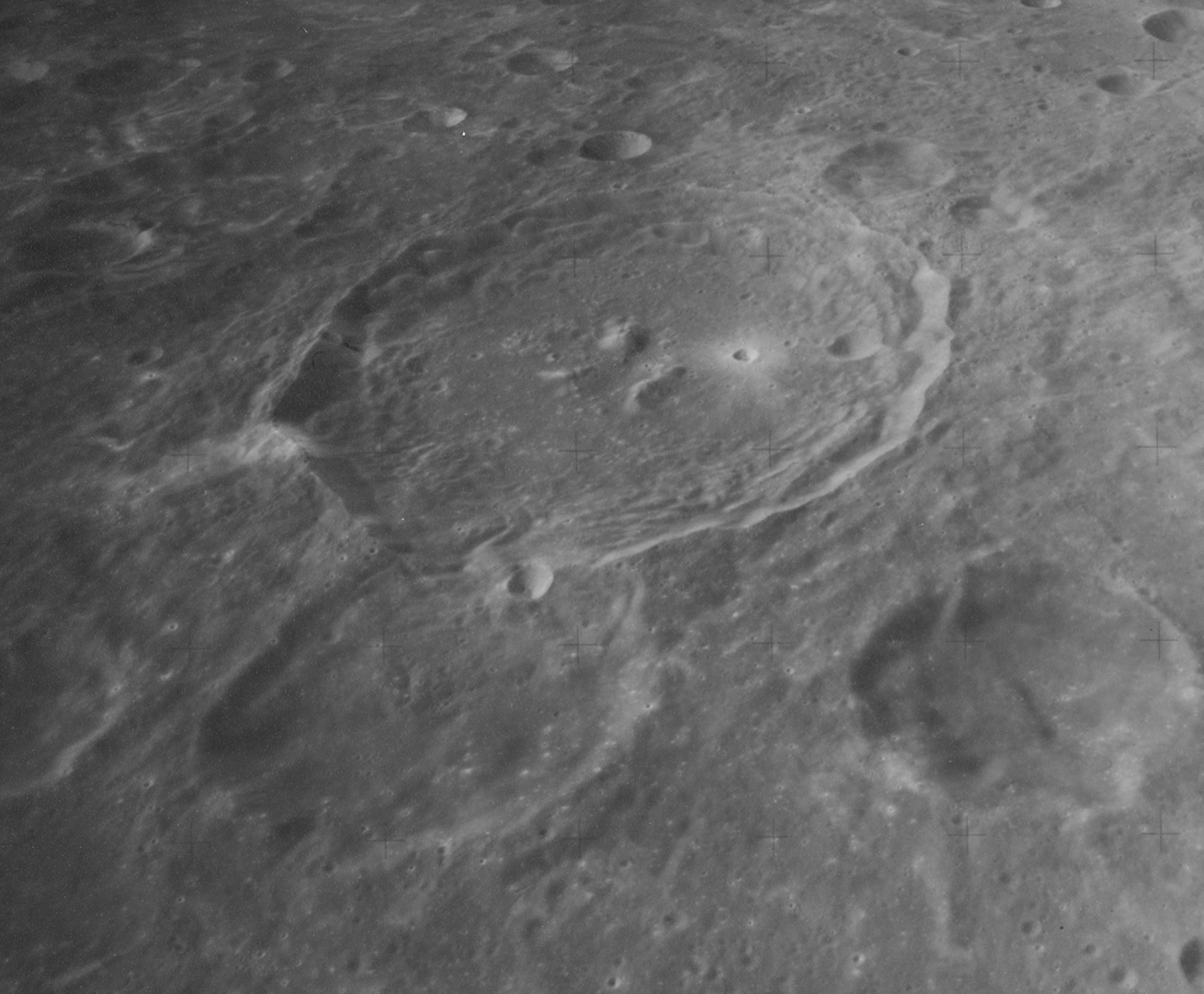
Oblique Apollo 16 mapping camera image

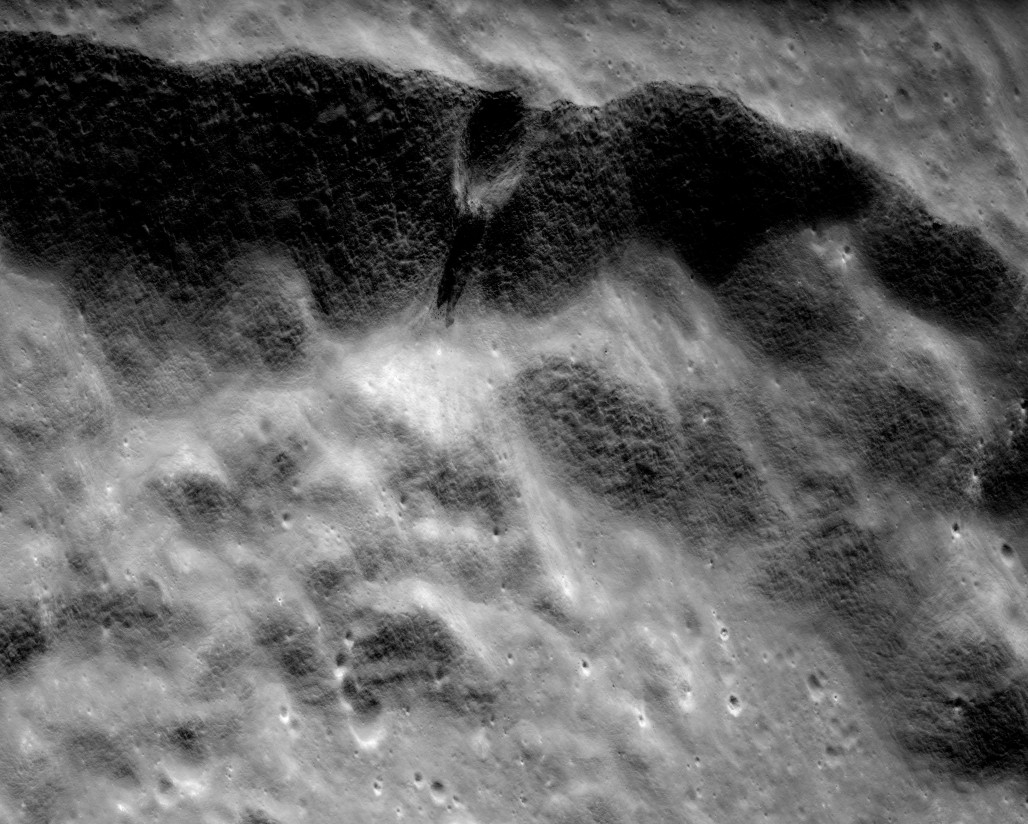
Small crater in the wall of Lobachevskiy with distinct flow lobes

== Satellite craters ==
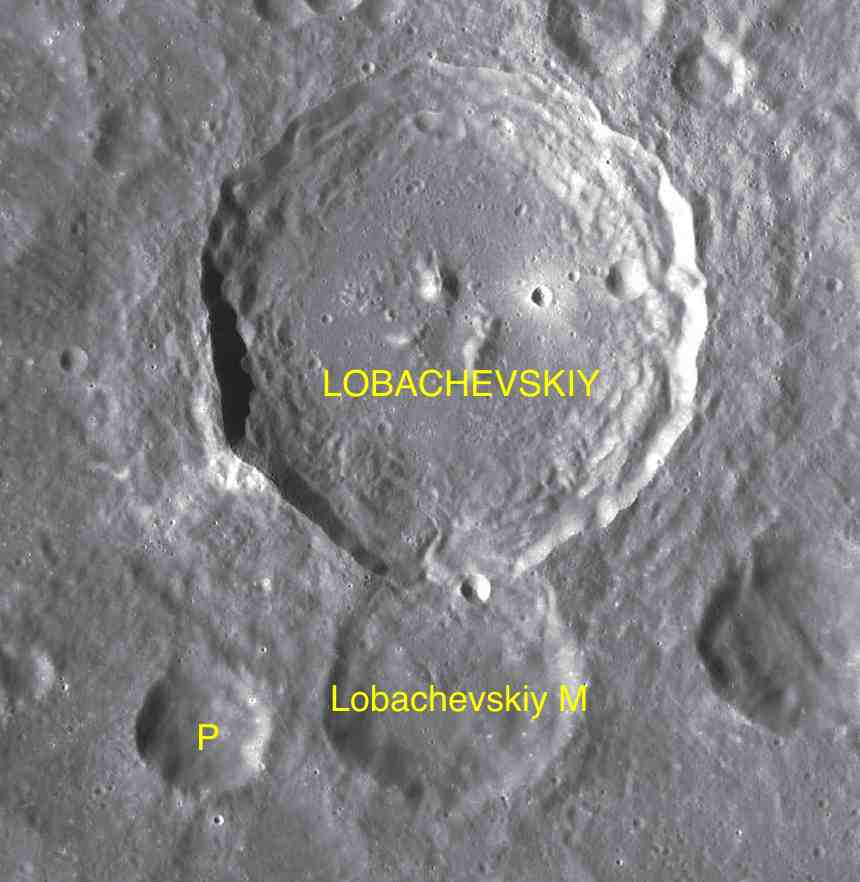
Lobachevskiy and its two satellite craters

By convention these features are identified on lunar maps by placing the letter on the side of the crater midpoint that is closest to Lobachevskiy.

Lobachevskiy	Latitude	Longitude	Diameter
M	8.0° N	112.8° E	41 km
P	7.7° N	111.3° E	26 km
