= Resonator =

Device or system that exhibits resonance

A resonator is a device or system that exhibits resonance or resonant behavior. That is, it naturally oscillates with greater amplitude at some frequencies, called resonant frequencies, than at other frequencies. The oscillations in a resonator can be either electromagnetic or mechanical (including acoustic). Resonators are used to either generate waves of specific frequencies or to select specific frequencies from a signal. Musical instruments use acoustic resonators that produce sound waves of specific tones. Another example is quartz crystals used in electronic devices such as Transmitterradio transmitters and quartz watches to produce oscillations of very precise frequency.

A standing wave in a rectangular cavity resonator

A cavity resonator is one in which waves exist in a hollow space inside the device. In electronics and radio, microwave cavities consisting of hollow metal boxes are used in microwave transmitters, receivers and test equipment to control frequency, in place of the tuned circuits which are used at lower frequencies. Acoustic cavity resonators, in which sound is produced by air vibrating in a cavity with one opening, are known as Helmholtz resonators.

== Explanation ==
A physical system can have as many resonant frequencies as it has degrees of freedom; each degree of freedom can vibrate as a harmonic oscillator. Systems with one degree of freedom, such as a mass on a spring, pendulums, balance wheels, and LC tuned circuits have one resonant frequency. Systems with two degrees of freedom, such as coupled pendulums and resonant transformers can have two resonant frequencies. A crystal lattice composed of N atoms bound together can have N resonant frequencies. As the number of coupled harmonic oscillators grows, the time it takes to transfer energy from one to the next becomes significant. The vibrations in them begin to travel through the coupled harmonic oscillators in waves, from one oscillator to the next.

The term resonator is most often used for a homogeneous object in which vibrations travel as waves, at an approximately constant velocity, bouncing back and forth between the sides of the resonator. The material of the resonator, through which the waves flow, can be viewed as being made of millions of coupled moving parts (such as atoms). Therefore, they can have millions of resonant frequencies, although only a few may be used in practical resonators. The oppositely moving waves interfere with each other, and at its resonant frequencies reinforce each other to create a pattern of standing waves in the resonator. If the distance between the sides is $d$, the length of a round trip is $2d$. To cause resonance, the phase of a sinusoidal wave after a round trip must be equal to the initial phase so the waves self-reinforce. The condition for resonance in a resonator is that the round trip distance, $2d$, is equal to an integer number of wavelengths $\lambda$ of the wave:

$$2d = N\lambda,\qquad\qquad N \in \{1,2,3,\dots\}$$

If the velocity of a wave is $c$, the frequency is $f = c / \lambda$, so the resonant frequencies are:

$$f = \frac{Nc}{2d}\qquad\qquad N \in \{1,2,3,\dots\}$$

So the resonant frequencies of resonators, called normal modes, are equally spaced multiples (harmonics) of a lowest frequency called the fundamental frequency. The above analysis assumes the medium inside the resonator is homogeneous, so the waves travel at a constant speed, and that the shape of the resonator is rectilinear. If the resonator is inhomogeneous or has a nonrectilinear shape, like a circular drumhead or a cylindrical microwave cavity, the resonant frequencies may not occur at equally spaced multiples of the fundamental frequency. They are then called overtones instead of harmonics. There may be several such series of resonant frequencies in a single resonator, corresponding to different modes of vibration.

== Electromagnetics ==
=== Resonant circuits ===
An electrical circuit composed of discrete components can act as a resonator when both an inductor and capacitor are included. Oscillations are limited by the inclusion of resistance, either via a specific resistor component, or due to resistance of the inductor windings. Such resonant circuits are also called RLC circuits after the circuit symbols for the components.

A distributed-parameter resonator has capacitance, inductance, and resistance that cannot be isolated into separate lumped capacitors, inductors, or resistors. An example of this, much used in filtering, is the helical resonator.

An inductor consisting of a coil of wire, is self-resonant at a certain frequency due to the parasitic capacitance between its turns. This is often an unwanted effect that can cause parasitic oscillations in RF circuits. The self-resonance of inductors is used in a few circuits, such as the Tesla coil.

=== Cavity resonators ===
A cavity resonator is a hollow closed conductor such as a metal box or a cavity within a metal block, containing electromagnetic waves (radio waves) reflecting back and forth between the cavity's walls. When a source of radio waves at one of the cavity's resonant frequencies is applied, the oppositely-moving waves form standing waves, and the cavity stores electromagnetic energy.

Since the cavity's lowest resonant frequency, the fundamental frequency, is that at which the width of the cavity is equal to a half-wavelength (λ/2), cavity resonators are only used at microwave frequencies and above, where wavelengths are short enough that the cavity is conveniently small in size.

Due to the low resistance of their conductive walls, cavity resonators have very high Q factors; that is their bandwidth, the range of frequencies around the resonant frequency at which they will resonate, is very narrow. Thus they can act as narrow bandpass filters. Cavity resonators are widely used as the frequency determining element in microwave oscillators. Their resonant frequency can be tuned by moving one of the walls of the cavity in or out, changing its size.

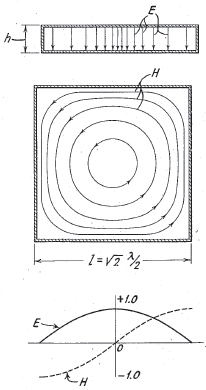
An illustration of the electric and magnetic field of one of the possible modes in a cavity resonator.

==== Cavity magnetron ====
The cavity magnetron is a vacuum tube with a filament in the center of an evacuated, lobed, circular cavity resonator. A perpendicular magnetic field is imposed by a permanent magnet. The magnetic field causes the electrons, attracted to the (relatively) positive outer part of the chamber, to spiral outward in a circular path rather than moving directly to this anode. Spaced about the rim of the chamber are cylindrical cavities. The cavities are open along their length and so they connect with the common cavity space. As electrons sweep past these openings they induce a resonant high frequency radio field in the cavity, which in turn causes the electrons to bunch into groups. A portion of this field is extracted with a short antenna that is connected to a waveguide (a metal tube usually of rectangular cross section). The waveguide directs the extracted RF energy to the load, which may be a cooking chamber in a microwave oven or a high gain antenna in the case of radar.

==== Klystron ====
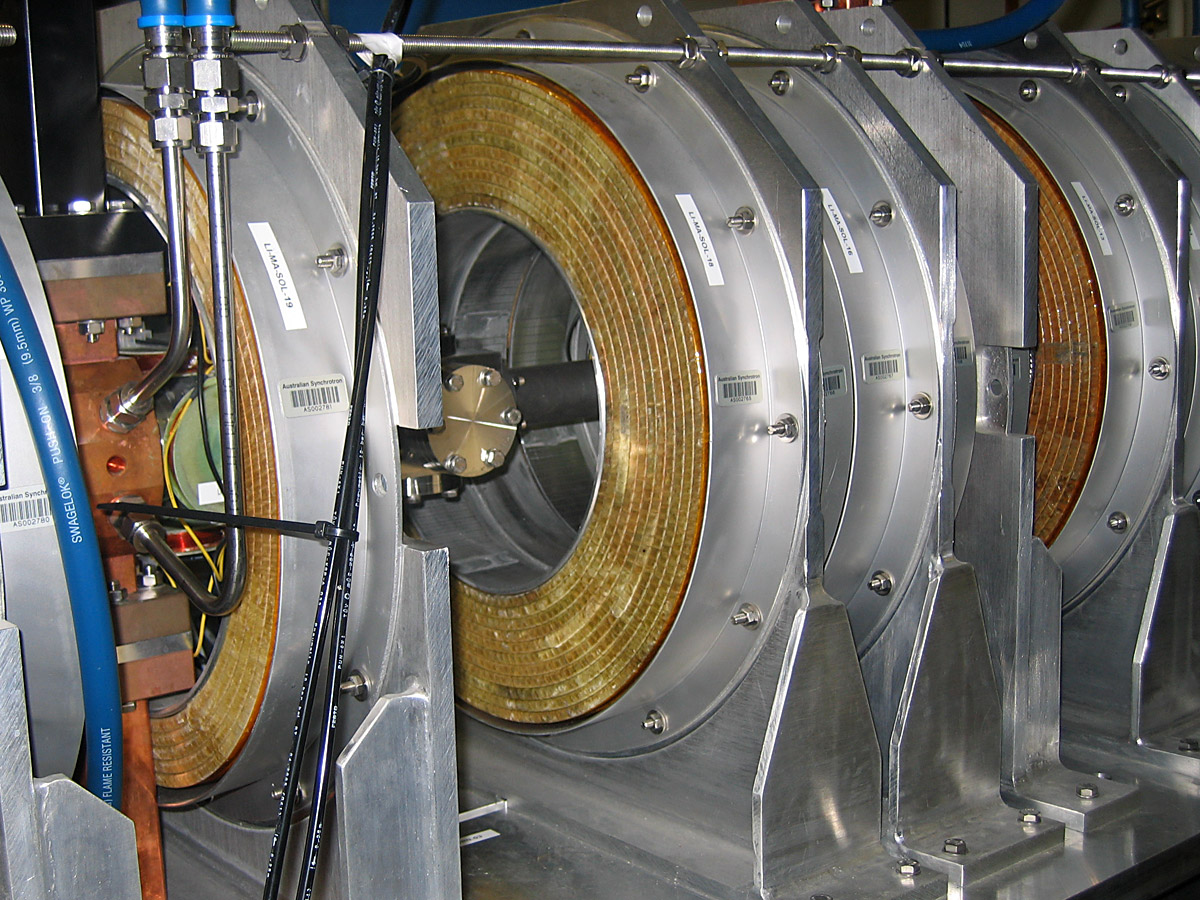
RF cavities in the linac of the Australian Synchrotron are used to accelerate and bunch beams of electrons; the linac is the tube passing through the middle of the cavity.

The klystron, tube waveguide, is a beam tube including at least two apertured cavity resonators. The beam of charged particles passes through the apertures of the resonators, often tunable wave reflection grids, in succession. A collector electrode is provided to intercept the beam after passing through the resonators. The first resonator causes bunching of the particles passing through it. The bunched particles travel in a field-free region where further bunching occurs, then the bunched particles enter the second resonator giving up their energy to excite it into oscillations. It is a particle accelerator that works in conjunction with a specifically tuned cavity by the configuration of the structures.

The reflex klystron is a klystron utilizing only a single apertured cavity resonator through which the beam of charged particles passes, first in one direction. A repeller electrode is provided to repel (or redirect) the beam after passage through the resonator back through the resonator in the other direction and in proper phase to reinforce the oscillations set up in the resonator.

==== Application in particle accelerators ====
On the beamline of an accelerator system, there are specific sections that are cavity resonators for radio frequency (RF) radiation. The (charged) particles that are to be accelerated pass through these cavities in such a way that the microwave electric field transfers energy to the particles, thus increasing their kinetic energy and thus accelerating them. Several large accelerator facilities employ superconducting niobium cavities for improved performance compared to metallic (copper) cavities.

=== Loop-gap resonator ===
The loop-gap resonator (LGR) is made by cutting a narrow slit along the length of a conducting tube. The slit has an effective capacitance and the bore of the resonator has an effective inductance. Therefore, the LGR can be modeled as an RLC circuit and has a resonant frequency that is typically between 200 MHz and 2 GHz. In the absence of radiation losses, the effective resistance of the LGR is determined by the resistivity and electromagnetic skin depth of the conductor used to make the resonator.

One key advantage of the LGR is that, at its resonant frequency, its dimensions are small compared to the free-space wavelength of the electromagnetic fields. Therefore, it is possible to use LGRs to construct a compact and high-Q resonator that operates at relatively low frequencies where cavity resonators would be impractically large.

=== Dielectric resonators ===
If a piece of material with large dielectric constant is surrounded by a material with much lower dielectric constant, then this abrupt change in dielectric constant can cause confinement of an electromagnetic wave, which leads to a resonator that acts similarly to a cavity resonator.

=== Transmission-line resonators ===
Transmission lines are structures that allow broadband transmission of electromagnetic waves, e.g. at radio or microwave frequencies. Abrupt change of impedance (e.g. open or short) in a transmission line causes reflection of the transmitted signal. Two such reflectors on a transmission line evoke standing waves between them and thus act as a one-dimensional resonator, with the resonance frequencies determined by their distance and the effective dielectric constant of the transmission line. A common form is the resonant stub, a length of transmission line terminated in either a short circuit or open circuit, connected in series or parallel with a main transmission line.

Planar transmission-line resonators are commonly employed for coplanar, stripline, and microstrip transmission lines. Such planar transmission-line resonators can be very compact in size and are widely used elements in microwave circuitry. In cryogenic solid-state research, superconducting transmission-line resonators contribute to solid-state spectroscopy and quantum information science.

=== Optical cavities ===
In a laser, light is amplified in a cavity resonator that is usually composed of two or more mirrors. Thus an optical cavity, also known as a resonator, is a cavity with walls that reflect electromagnetic waves (i.e. light). This allows standing wave modes to exist with little loss.

== Mechanical ==
Mechanical resonators are used in electronic circuits to generate signals of a precise frequency. For example, piezoelectric resonators, commonly made from quartz, are used as frequency references. Common designs consist of electrodes attached to a piece of quartz, in the shape of a rectangular plate for high frequency applications, or in the shape of a tuning fork for low frequency applications. The high dimensional stability and low temperature coefficient of quartz helps keeps resonant frequency constant. In addition, the quartz's piezoelectric property converts the mechanical vibrations into an oscillating voltage, which is picked up by the attached electrodes. These crystal oscillators are used in quartz clocks and watches, to create the clock signal that runs computers, and to stabilize the output signal from radio transmitters.

Mechanical resonators can also be used to induce a standing wave in other media. For example, a multiple degree of freedom system can be created by imposing a base excitation on a cantilever beam. In this case the standing wave is imposed on the beam. This type of system can be used as a sensor to track changes in frequency or phase of the resonance of the fiber. One application is as a measurement device for dimensional metrology.

== Acoustic ==
The most familiar examples of acoustic resonators are in musical instruments. Every musical instrument has resonators. Some generate the sound directly, such as the wooden bars in a xylophone, the head of a drum, the strings in stringed instruments, and the pipes in an organ. Some modify the sound by enhancing particular frequencies, such as the sound box of a guitar or violin. Organ pipes, the bodies of woodwinds, and the sound boxes of stringed instruments are examples of acoustic cavity resonators.

=== Automobiles ===
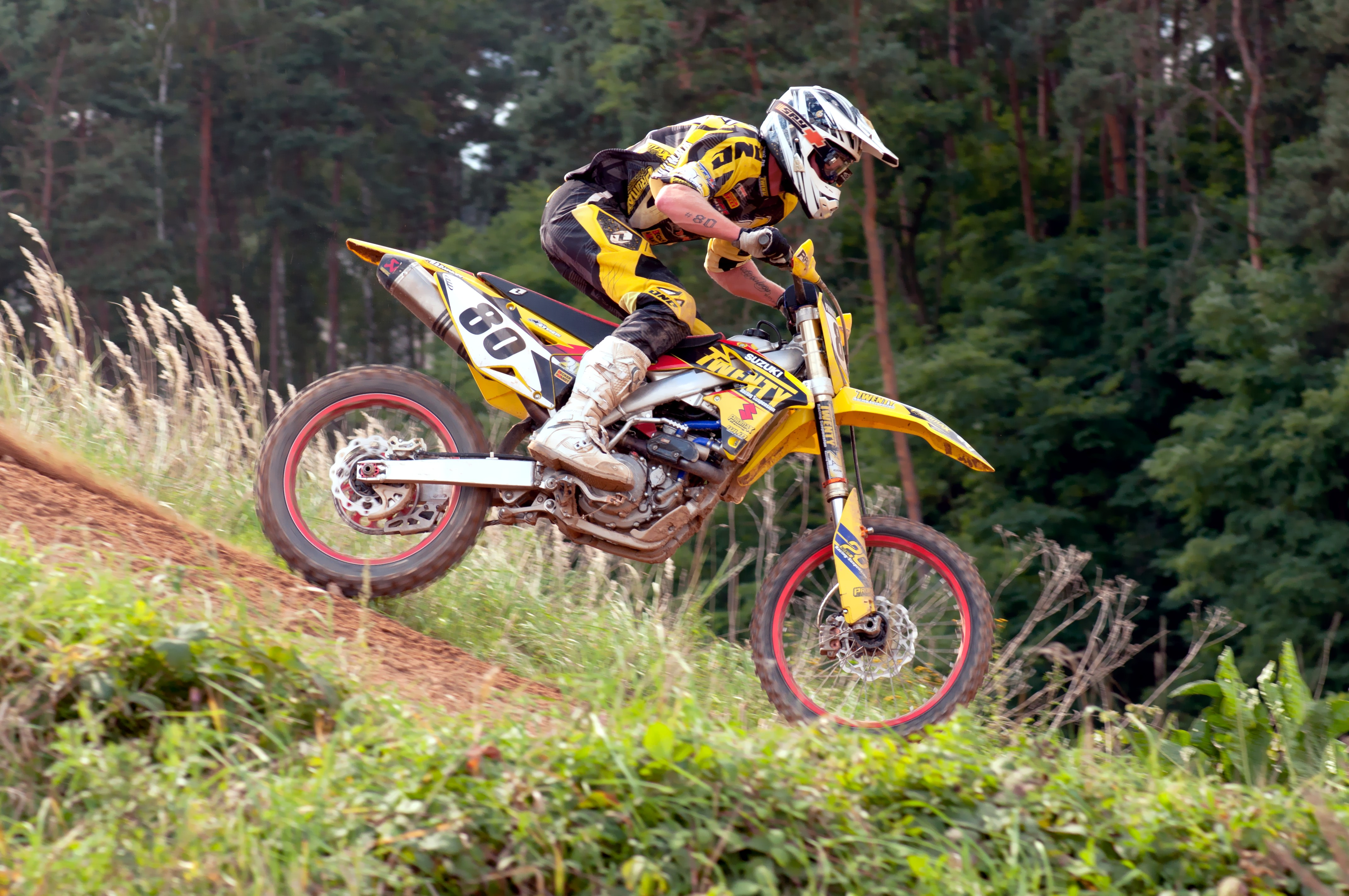
A sport motorcycle, equipped with exhaust resonator, designed for performance

The exhaust pipes in automobile exhaust systems are designed as acoustic resonators that work with the muffler to reduce noise, by making sound waves "cancel each other out". The "exhaust note" is an important feature for some vehicle owners, so both the original manufacturers and the after-market suppliers use the resonator to enhance the sound. In "tuned exhaust" systems designed for performance, the resonance of the exhaust pipes can also be used to remove combustion products from the combustion chamber at a particular engine speed or range of speeds.

=== Percussion instruments ===
In many keyboard percussion instruments, below the centre of each note is a tube, which is an acoustic cavity resonator. The length of the tube varies according to the pitch of the note, with higher notes having shorter resonators. The tube is open at the top end and closed at the bottom end, creating a column of air that resonates when the note is struck. This adds depth and volume to the note. In string instruments, the body of the instrument is a resonator. The tremolo effect of a vibraphone is achieved via a mechanism that opens and shuts the resonators.

=== Stringed instruments ===
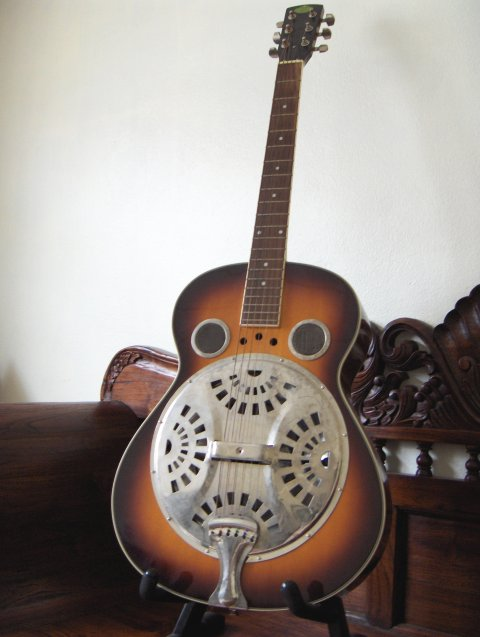
A Dobro-style resonator guitar

String instruments such as the bluegrass banjo may also have resonators. Many five-string banjos have removable resonators, so players can use the instrument with a resonator in bluegrass style, or without it in folk music style. The term resonator, used by itself, may also refer to the resonator guitar.

The modern ten-string guitar, invented by Narciso Yepes, adds four sympathetic string resonators to the traditional classical guitar. By tuning these resonators in a very specific way (C, B♭, A♭, G♭) and making use of their strongest partials (corresponding to the octaves and fifths of the strings' fundamental tones), the bass strings of the guitar now resonate equally with any of the 12 tones of the chromatic octave. The guitar resonator is a device for driving guitar string harmonics by an electromagnetic field. This resonance effect is caused by a feedback loop and is applied to drive the fundamental tones, octaves, 5th, 3rd to an infinite sustain.

== See also ==
- Coupling coefficient of resonators
- Crab cavity
- Nuclear magnetic resonance
- Optical ring resonators
- Superconducting RF
- Resonance chamber
