= GDOS =

GDOS may refer to:

- Glow discharge optical spectroscopy
- Graphics Device Operating System, part of the Graphics Environment Manager
- Green's Dictionary of Slang
- GDOS, an operating system for the DISCiPLE disk interface of the ZX Spectrum

== See also ==
- GDO (disambiguation)
