= Absorption wavemeter =

Instrument to measure radio wave frequency

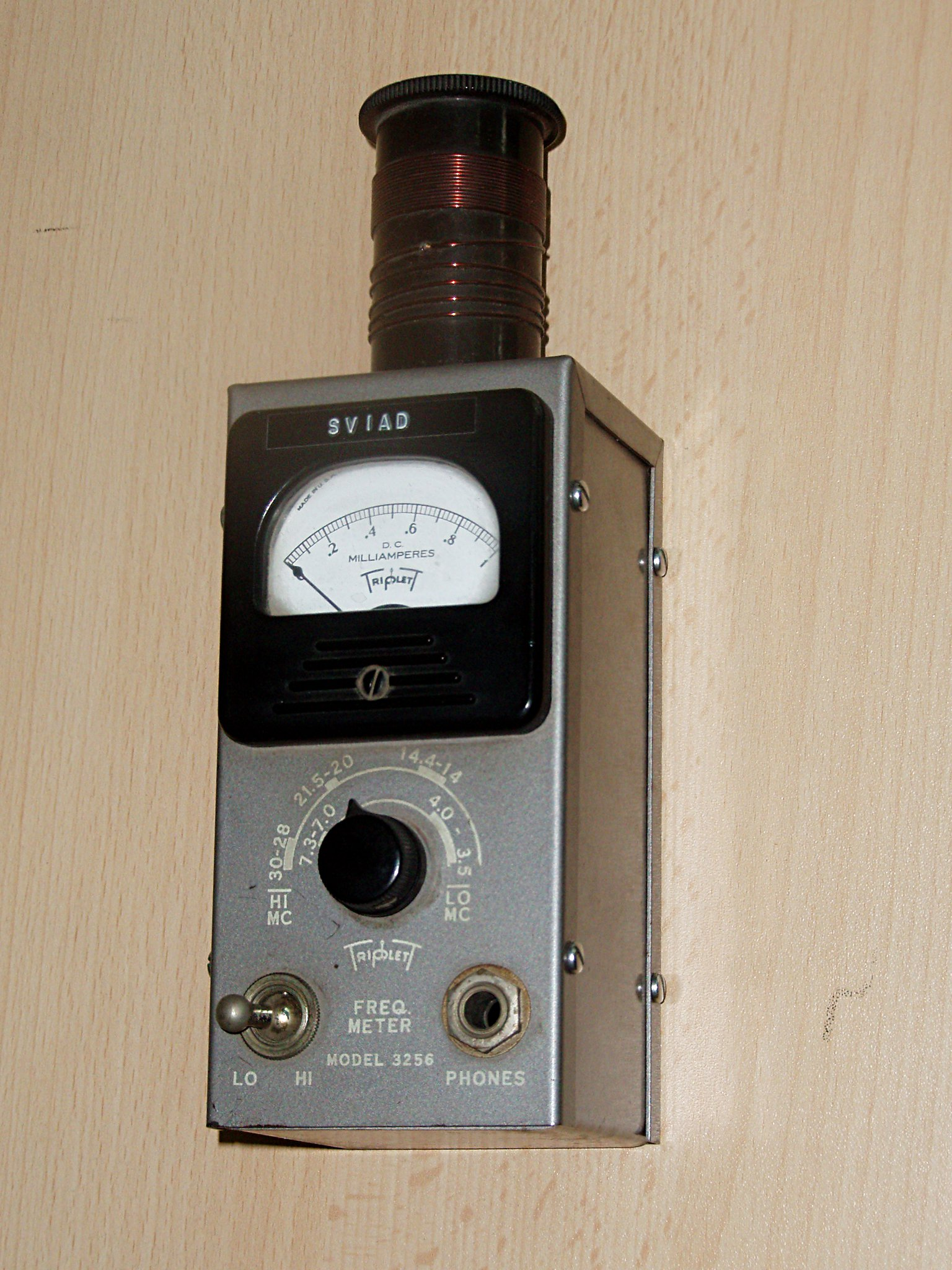
A Triplet 3256 wavemeter for use in the high frequency band.

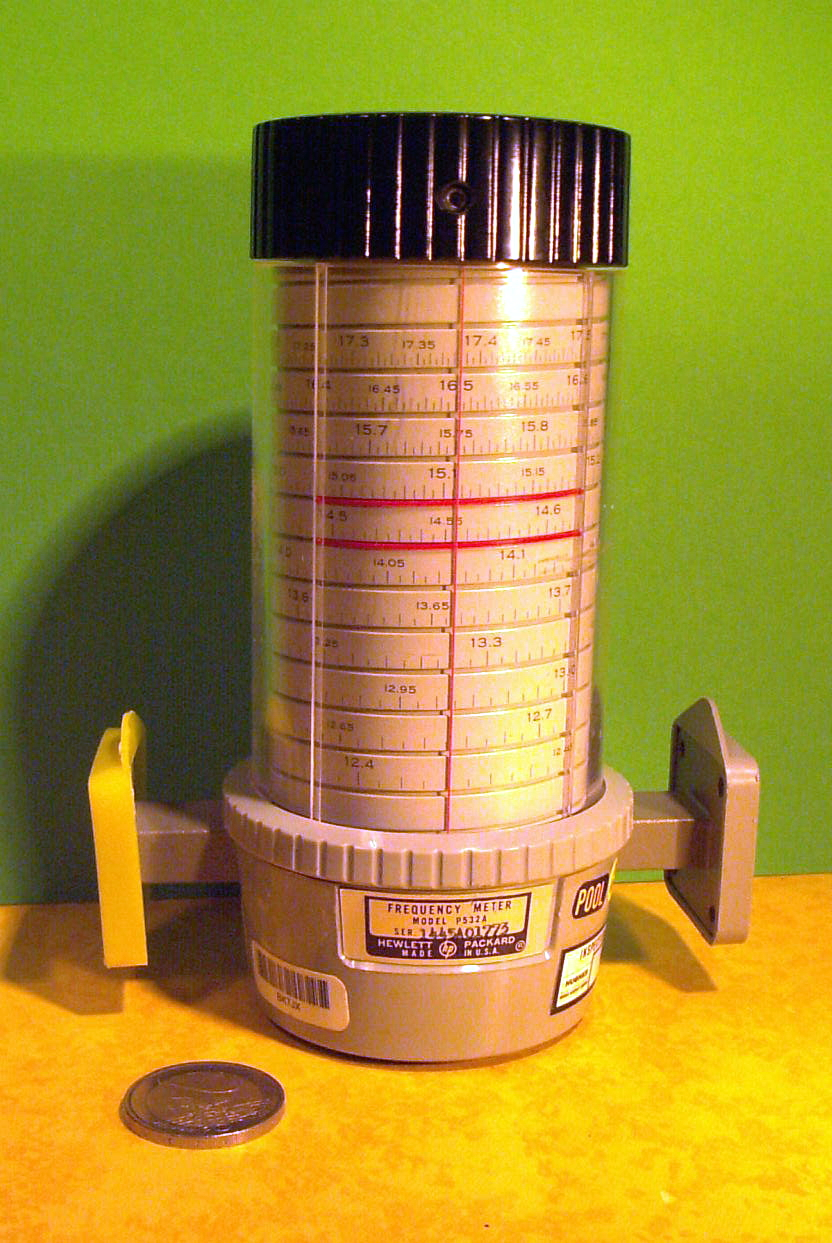
HP Model 532A frequency meter for measuring microwave frequencies in the Range between 8.2 GHz to 12.4 GHz with wavguide flanges

An absorption wavemeter is a simple electronic instrument used to measure the frequency of radio waves. It is an older method of measuring frequency, widely used from the birth of radio in the early 20th century until the 1970s, when the development of inexpensive frequency counters, which have far greater accuracy, made it largely obsolete.

== Overview ==
A wavemeter consists of an adjustable resonant circuit calibrated in frequency, with a meter or other means to measure the voltage or current in the circuit. When adjusted to resonance with the unknown frequency, the resonant circuit absorbs energy, which is indicated by a dip on the meter. Then the frequency can be read from the dial.

Wavemeters are used for frequency measurements that do not require high accuracy, such as checking that a radio transmitter is operating within its correct frequency band, or checking for harmonics in the output. Many radio amateurs keep them as a simple way to check their output frequency. Similar devices can be made for detection of mobile phones. As an alternative, a dip meter can be used.

There are two categories of wavemeters: transmission wavemeters, which have an input and an output port and are inserted into the signal path, or absorption wavemeters, which are loosely coupled to the radio frequency source and absorb energy from it.

== HF and VHF ==
The most simple form of the device is a variable capacitor with a coil wired across its terminals. Attached to one the terminals of the LC circuit is a diode, then between the end of the diode not wired to the LC circuit and the terminal of the LC circuit not bearing the diode is wired a ceramic decoupling capacitor. Finally a galvanometer is wired to the terminals of the decoupling capacitor. The device will be sensitive to strong sources of radiowaves at the frequency at which the LC circuit is resonant.

This is given by $f = {1 \over 2 \pi \sqrt {LC}}$

When the device is exposed to an RF field which is at the resonant frequency a DC voltage will appear on the terminals on the left hand side. The coil is often outside the case of the unit so it can be brought close to the object being probed.

== UHF and SHF ==
At the higher frequencies it is not possible to use lumped components for the tuned circuit. Instead methods such as stripline or resonant cavities are used. One design for ultra high frequencies (UHF) and super high frequencies (SHF) is a resonant λ/4 (quarter wave) rod which can vary in length. Another design for X-band (10 GHz) is a resonant cavity which can be changed in length.

As an alternative for UHF, Lecher transmission lines can be used. It is possible to measure roughly the frequency of a transmitter using Lecher lines.

== See also ==
- Grid dip oscillator
