= Loop-gap resonator =

Type of electromagnetic resonator

A cylindrical loop-gap resonator of length $\ell$.

A loop-gap resonator (LGR) is an electromagnetic resonator that operates in the radio and microwave frequency ranges. The simplest LGRs are made from a conducting tube with a narrow slit cut along its length. The LGR dimensions are typically much smaller than the free-space wavelength of the electromagnetic fields at the resonant frequency. Therefore, relatively compact LGRs can be designed to operate at frequencies that are too low to be accessed using, for example, cavity resonators. These structures can have very sharp resonances (high quality factors) making them useful for electron spin resonance (ESR) experiments, and precision measurements of electromagnetic material properties (permittivity and permeability).

== Background ==
Loop-gap resonators (LGRs) can be modelled as lumped-element circuits. The slit along the length of the resonator has an effective capacitance $C$ and the bore of the resonator has effective inductance $L$. At, or near, the resonance frequency, a circumferential current is established along the inner wall of the resonator. The effective resistance $R$ that limits this current is, in part, determined by the resistivity $\rho$ and electromagnetic skin depth $\delta$ of the conductor used to make the LGR. It is, therefore, possible to model the LGR as an $LRC$ circuit. Since the LGR current is a maximum at the resonant frequency, the equivalent circuit model is a series $LRC$ circuit. This circuit model works well provided the dimensions of the resonator remain small compared to the free-space wavelength of the electromagnetic fields.

One advantage of the LGR is that it produces regions of uniform electric and magnetic fields that are isolated from one another. A uniform electric field exists within the slit of the LGR and a uniform magnetic field exists within the bore of the resonator. The uniform magnetic field makes the LGR a good source of microwave magnetic fields in ESR experiments. Furthermore, because the electric and magnetic fields are isolated from one another, one can use the LGR to independently probe the electric and magnetic properties of materials. For example, if the gap of the LGR is filled with a dielectric material, the effective capacitance of the LGR will be modified which will change the frequency $f_0$ and quality factor $Q$ of the resonance. Measurements of the changes in $f_0$ and $Q$ can be used to fully determine the complex permittivity of the dielectric material. Likewise, if the bore of the LGR is filled with a magnetic material, the effective inductance of the LGR will be modified and the resulting changes in $f_0$ and $Q$ can be used to extract the complex permeability of the magnetic material.

== Resonant Frequency and Quality Factor ==
Cross-sectional view of a cylindrical loop-gap resonator with the critical dimensions labelled.

=== Resonance frequency ===
The capacitance of the gap of the LGR is given by

$$C = \varepsilon_0 \frac{w\, \ell}{t} \,,$$

where $\varepsilon_0$ is the permittivity of free space, $w$ is the thickness of the bore wall, $t$ is the gap width, and $\ell$ is the length of the resonator. The resonator bore acts as a single-turn solenoid with inductance given by

$$L = \mu_0 \frac{\pi \, r_0^2}{\ell} \,,$$

where $\mu_0$ is the permeability of free space and $r_0$ is the inner radius of the LGR bore. For a high-$Q$ resonator, the resonant frequency is, to an approximation, given by

$$f_0 \approx \frac{1}{2\pi}\frac{1}{\sqrt{LC}}=\frac{c}{2\pi r_0}\sqrt{\frac{t}{\pi w}}\,,$$

where $c=1/\sqrt{\varepsilon_0\mu_0}$ is the vacuum speed of light. Therefore, the resonant frequency of the LGR is determined from its geometry and is, to first approximation, independent of its length.

=== Quality factor ===
For a highly underdamped series $LRC$ circuit, the quality factor, which determines the sharpness of the resonance, is given by

$$Q \approx \frac{1}{R}\sqrt{\frac{L}{C}}\,.$$

The effective resistance of a LGR can be estimated by considering the length of conductor through which the current travels and the cross-sectional area available to it. The relevant conductor length is the circumference $2\pi r_0$ of the conductor's inner surface. The depth that the current penetrates into the inner surface of the LGR bore is determined by the electromagnetic skin depth $\delta$. Therefore, the cross-sectional area through which charge flows is $\delta\,\ell$. Combining these results gives an effective resistance

$$R_\rho \approx \rho\frac{2\pi r_0}{\delta\,\ell}\,,$$

where $\rho$ is the resistivity of the conductor. The effective capacitance, inductance, and resistance then lead to a simple expression for the expected quality factor of the LGR

$$Q \approx \frac{r_0}{\delta}\,,$$

where, for a good conductor, the electromagnetic skin depth at the resonance frequency is given by

$$\delta \approx \sqrt{\frac{2\rho}{\mu_0\omega_0}}\,,$$

and $\omega_0=2\pi f_0$. For an aluminum resonator with $r_0 =1\,\mathrm{cm}$ and $f_0=1\,\mathrm{GHz}$ the above analysis predicts $Q\approx 3900$.

=== Radiative losses ===
In practice, the measured quality factor a cylindrical LGR, without additional electromagnetic shielding, will be much less than the predicted value of $r_0/\delta$. The suppression of the quality factor is due to radiative power loss from magnetic field lines that extend out of LGR bore and into free space. An order-of-magnitude estimate of the effective radiation resistance can be made by treating the LGR as a conducting loop. In the limit that the wavelength of the radiation is much larger than the loop radius $r_0$, the radiation resistance is

$$R_\mathrm{r} \approx \frac{\pi}{6}\sqrt{\frac{\mu_0}{\varepsilon_0}}\left(\frac{\omega_0 r_0}{c}\right)^4\,,$$

and can be much larger than the resistance $R_\rho$ due to the resistivity of the LGR conductor. The radiative losses can be suppressed by placing the LGR inside a circular waveguide. Provided that the cutoff frequency of the lowest TE_{11} waveguide mode is well above the resonant frequency of the LGR, the magnetic field lines will be prevented from propagating into free space. The presence of the electromagnetic shield will alter the resonant frequency and quality factor of the LGR, but typically by only a few percent.

=== Toroidal LGR ===
Drawing of a toroidal LGR with a section cut out so as to expose the bore and gap of the resonator.

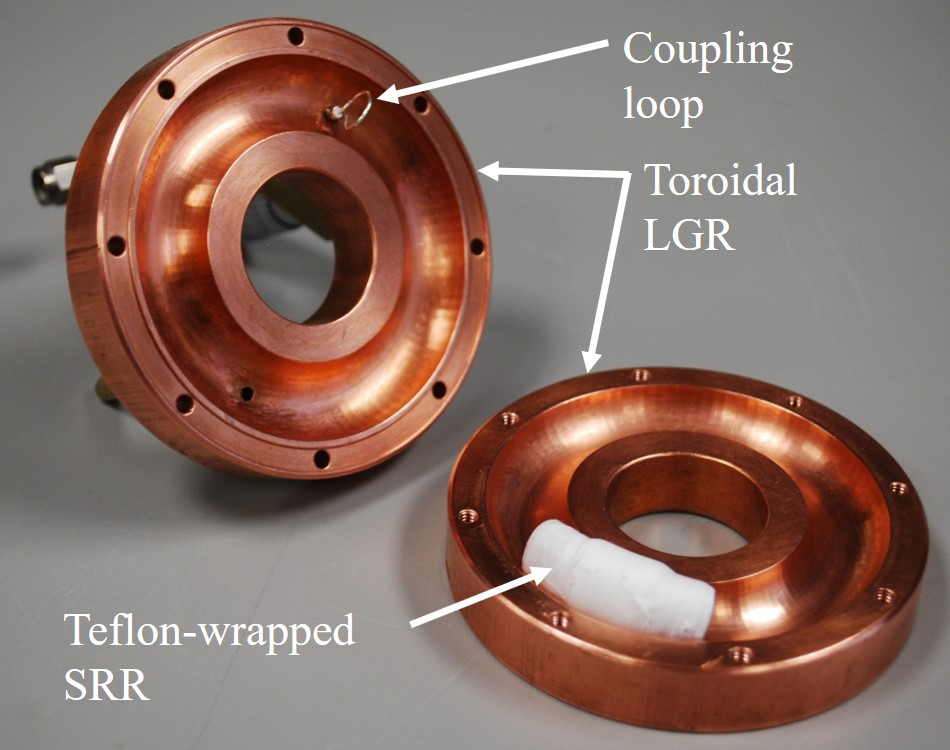
Photograph of the two halves of a copper toroidal loop-gap resonator. Also visible are an inductive coupling loop suspended within the resonator bore and a so-called extended split-ring resonator placed in the LGR bore.

In some applications requiring high quality factors, the electromagnetic shielding provided by a concentric circular waveguide surrounding a cylindrical LGR can be bulky and awkward to work. A toroidal LGR can be used for high-$Q$ measurements without requiring additional electromagnetic shielding. In the toroidal geometry the two ends of a cylindrical LGR are joined to form a completely closed structure. In this case, the magnetic field is completely confined within the bore of the resonator and there is no radiative power loss. The toroidal LGR consists of two halves that are bolted together along the outer diameter of the structure.

Like the cylindrical LGR, the toroidal LGR can be modelled as a series $LRC$ circuit. In general, the effective capacitance, inductance, and resistance of the toroidal LGR will differ from the expressions given above for the cylindrical LGR. However, in limit that the radius of the torus is large compared to the bore radius $r_0$, the capacitance, inductance, and resistance of the toroidal LGR are approximated by the expressions above if one takes $\ell$ to be equal to the circumference of the torus.

The toroidal LGR is particularly convenient when characterizing the electromagnetic properties of liquid samples or particles suspended in a liquid. In these cases, the bore of the toroidal LGR can be partially filled with the liquid sample without requiring a special sample holder. This setup allows one to characterize the magnetic properties of, for example, a ferrofluid. Alternatively, if the liquid sample is nonmagnetic, the entire toroidal LGR can be submerged in the liquid (or gas). In this case, the dielectric properties of the sample only modify the effective capacitance of the resonator and the changes in $f_0$ and $Q$ can be used to determine the complex permittivity of the sample.

== Coupling to a LGR ==
Inductive coupling loops are typically used to couple magnetic flux into and out of the LGR. The coupling loops are made by first removing a length of outer conductor and dielectric from a semi-rigid coaxial cable. The exposed centre conductor is then bent into a loop and short-circuited to the outer conductor. The opposite end of the coaxial cable is connected to either a signal generator or a receiver. In the case of a signal generator, an oscillating current is established in the coupling loop. By Faraday's law of induction, this current creates and oscillating magnetic flux which can be coupled into the bore of the LGR. This magnetic flux, in turn, induces circumferential currents along the inner wall of the LGR. The induced current, once again by Faraday's law, creates an approximately uniform oscillating magnetic field in the bore of the LGR. A second coupling loop, connected to a receiver, can be used to detect the magnetic flux produced by the LGR. Alternatively, using a vector network analyzer (VNA), a single coupling loop can be used to both inject a signal into the LGR and measure its response. The VNA can measure the ratio of the forward and reflected voltages ($S_{11}$, or reflection coefficient) as a function of microwave frequency. Far away from resonance, the magnitude of the reflection coefficient will be close to one since very little power is coupled into the LGR at these frequencies. However, near the resonance frequency $f_0$, the magnitude of the reflection coefficient will fall below one as power is transferred into the LGR. The coupling between the external circuits and the LGR can be tuned by adjusting the relative positions and orientations of the coupling loop and LGR. At critical coupling, impedance matching is achieved and the reflection coefficient approaches zero.

It is also possible to capacitively couple electric fields into and out of the gap of the LGR using suitably-fashioned electrodes at the end of a coaxial cable.

== Multi-Loop, Multi-Gap LGRs ==
Designs of some multi-loop, multi-gap LGRs. Top: Two-loop, one-gap LGR. Middle: Three-loop, two-gap LGR. Bottom: Five-loop, four-gap LGR.

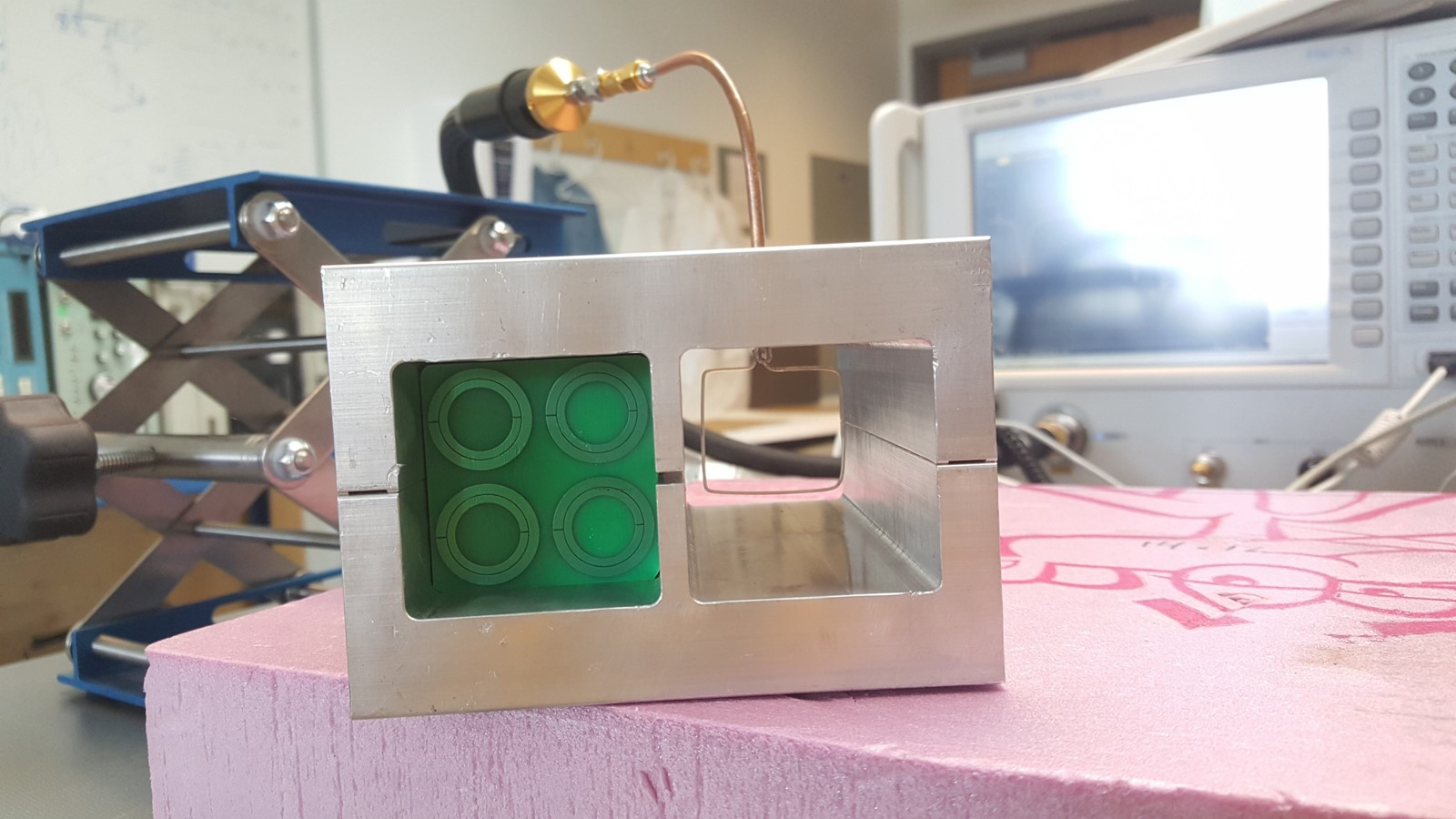
Photograph of an aluminum two-loop, one-gap LGR. Also visible are an inductive coupling loop suspended within the right-hand bore of the resonator and a $2\times 2$ array of planar split-ring resonators in the left-hand bore of the resonator.

Multi-loop, multi-gap LGRs have also been developed. The simplest of these is the two-loop, one-gap LGR. In this case, magnetic field lines form closed loops by passing through each of the bores of the LGR and the currents on the inner walls propagate in opposite directions - clockwise in one bore and counterclockwise in the other. The equivalent circuit, neglecting losses, is a parallel combination of inductors $L$ and $L_0$ in series with capacitance $C$. If $L=L_0$, then the resonant frequency of the two-loop, one-gap LGR is $\sqrt{2}$ times greater than that of the conventional one-loop, one-gap LGR having the same bore and gap dimensions. It is also worth noting that, since magnetic field lines pass from one bore to the other, radiative power losses are strongly suppressed and the resonator maintains a high quality factor without requiring additional electromagnetic shielding.

The multi-loop, multi-gap LGRs with more than two loops have more than one resonant mode. If the central bore is singled out as having inductance $L_0$, then one of the resonant modes is one in which all of the magnetic flux from each of the external loops of inductance $L$ is shared with the central loop. For this mode, the resonant frequency of an $n$-loop, $(n-1)$-gap LGR is given by

$$f_0 \approx \frac{1}{2\pi}\sqrt{\frac{n}{LC}}\,,$$

where it has been assumed that all loops have the same inductance $L$.

== LGRs and superconductivity ==
The Meissner effect in a platelet superconducting single crystal. The blue lines represent an applied magnetic field. Magnetic fields penetrate a depth $\lambda$ into the crystal. In a single-crystal superconductor, there is a unique penetration depth for each of the crystallographic directions.

Loop-gap resonators have been used to make precise measurements of the electrodynamic properties of unconventional superconductors. Most notably, a LGR was used to reveal the linear temperature dependence of the magnetic penetration depth, characteristic of a d-wave superconductor, in a single crystal of YBa_{2}Cu_{3}O_{6.95}. In these experiments, a superconducting sample is placed inside the bore of a LGR. The diamagnetic response of the superconductor alters in the inductance of the LGR and, therefore, its resonant frequency. As described below, tracking the change in the resonant frequency as the temperature of the sample is changed allows one to deduce the temperature dependence of the magnetic penetration depth.

=== Theory ===
The inductance of the LGR can be expressed as $L=\mu_0 V_\mathrm{r}/\ell^2$, where $V_\mathrm{r}$ is the volume of the LGR bore. Since the resonant frequency $f_0$ of the LGR is proportional to $L^{-1/2}$, a small change in the effective volume of the resonator bore will result in a change in the resonant frequency given by

$$\delta f_0 = -\frac{f_0}{2} \frac{\delta V_\mathrm{r}}{V_\mathrm{r}}\,.$$

Due to the Meissner effect, when a superconducting sample is placed in the bore of a LGR, the magnetic flux is expelled from the interior of the sample to within a penetration depth $\lambda$ of its surface. Therefore, the effective volume of the resonator bore is reduced by an amount equal to the volume from which the magnetic flux has been excluded. This excluded volume is given by

$$V_\mathrm{ex} \approx ab\left(c-2\lambda_a\right)\,,$$

where $a$, $b$, and $c$ are the sample dimensions along the three crystallographic directions and $abc$ is the sample volume $V_\mathrm{s}$. In the above expression, it has been assumed that the microwave magnetic field is applied parallel to the $b$-axis of the sample. Since the presence of the superconductor reduces the LGR volume, $\delta V_\mathrm{r}=-V_\mathrm{ex}$ and

$$\delta f_0 = \frac{f_0}{2 V_\mathrm{r}} \left(V_\mathrm{s}-2ab\lambda_a\right)\,.$$

Solving this expression for the $a$-axis penetration depth yields

$$\lambda_a = \frac{c}{2}-\frac{V_\mathrm{r}}{ab}\frac{\delta f_0}{f_0}\,.$$

Generally, it is not possible to use LGR frequency-shift measurements to determine the absolute value of the penetration depth because it would require knowing the sample thickness $c$ very precisely. For example, in fully doped YBa_{2}Cu_{3}O_{7}, $\lambda_a\approx 100~\mathrm{nm}$ at low temperature. Therefore, to use the LGR measurement to determine $\lambda_a$ to within 10%, one would have to know the value of $c$ with an accuracy of $10~\mathrm{nm}$ which is typically not possible.

Instead, the strategy is to track the changes in frequency as the sample temperature varies (while keeping the LGR at a fixed temperature). The absolute penetration depth can be expressed as

$$\lambda_a(T) = \lambda_a(T_0)+\Delta\lambda_a(T)\,,$$

where $T$ is temperature, $T_0$ is the experimental base temperature, and $\Delta\lambda_a(T)$ is the change in penetration depth as the sample temperature is increased above the base temperature. One can, therefore, express the change in penetration depth as

$$\Delta\lambda_a(T) = \lambda_a(T)-\lambda_a(T_0)=-\frac{V_\mathrm{r}}{ab}\frac{1}{f_0}\left[\delta f_0(T)-\delta f_0(T_0)\right]\,.$$

Finally, defining $\Delta f_0(T)=\delta f_0(T)-\delta f_0(T_0)$, one has

$$\Delta\lambda_a(T) = -\frac{V_\mathrm{r}}{ab}\frac{\Delta f_0(T)}{f_0}\,.$$

This final expression shows how the LGR shifts in resonant frequency can be used to determine the temperature dependence of the magnetic penetration depth in a superconducting sample.

=== Experimental details ===
In a d-wave superconductor, the penetration depth typically changes by a few ångströms per degree kelvin, which corresponds to $\Delta f_0/f_0\sim 10^{-10}$ for a $1~\mathrm{mm}^2$ platelet sample in a LGR with a bore volume of $1~\mathrm{cm}^3$. Measuring such small changes in relative frequency requires an extremely high-$Q$ resonator. The ultrahigh quality factors are obtained by coating the LGR surfaces with a superconducting material, such as a lead-tin alloy. The resonator is then cooled below the superconducting transition temperature of the coating using a bath of superfluid liquid helium. Quality factors of $10^6$ have been achieved using copper LGRs coated with lead-tin and cooled to $1~\mathrm{K}$.

== Measuring permittivity and permeability ==
This section describes how LGRs can be used to determine the electromagnetic properties of materials. When there are no materials filling either the gap or bore of the resonator, the impedance $Z$ of the LGR can be expressed as

$$Z = R+j\omega L +\frac{1}{j\omega C}\,,$$

where $j=\sqrt{-1}$. Re-expressed in terms of the resonant frequency $\omega_0$ and quality factor $Q$, the impedance is given by

$$\frac{Z}{QR} = \frac{1}{Q}+j\left(\frac{\omega}{\omega_0} - \frac{\omega_0}{\omega}\right)\,.$$

A measurement of the frequency dependence of the impedance of an empty LGR can be used to determine $\omega_0$ and $Q$. The impedance measurement is most easily done using the vector network analyzer (VNA) to measure the reflection coefficient $S_{11}$ from an inductively-coupled LGR. The impedance and reflection coefficient are related by

$$S_{11} = \frac{Z_0-Z}{Z_0+Z}\,,$$

where $Z_0$ is the output impedance of the VNA (usually, $Z_0=50~\Omega)$).

=== Complex permittivity ===
Now suppose that the gap of resonator has been completely filled with a dielectric material that has complex relative permittivity $\varepsilon_\mathrm{r}=\varepsilon^\prime-j\varepsilon^{\prime\prime}$. In this case, the effective capacitance becomes $\varepsilon_\mathrm{r}C$ and the impedance of the LGR is given by

$$Z_\varepsilon = R+j\omega L +\frac{1}{j\omega \left(\varepsilon^\prime-j\varepsilon^{\prime\prime}\right)C}\,.$$

Separating the real and imaginary terms leads to

$$Z_\varepsilon = \left[R+\left(\frac{\varepsilon^{\prime\prime}}{\left(\varepsilon^\prime\right)^2+\left(\varepsilon^{\prime\prime}\right)^2}\right)\frac{1}{\omega C}\right] +j\left[\omega L-\left(\frac{\varepsilon^{\prime}}{\left(\varepsilon^\prime\right)^2+\left(\varepsilon^{\prime\prime}\right)^2}\right)\frac{1}{\omega C}\right]\,.$$

This expression shows that a nonzero $\varepsilon^{\prime\prime}$ enhances the effective resistance of the LGR and, therefore, lowers its quality factor. A nonzero $\varepsilon^{\prime}$, on the other hand, alters the imaginary part of the impedance and modifies the resonant frequency. Written in terms of the empty-resonator resonant frequency and quality factor, the above impedance can be expressed as

$$\frac{Z_\varepsilon}{QR} = \left[\frac{1}{Q}+\left(\frac{\varepsilon^{\prime\prime}}{\left(\varepsilon^\prime\right)^2+\left(\varepsilon^{\prime\prime}\right)^2}\right)\frac{\omega_0}{\omega}\right] +j\left[\frac{\omega}{\omega_0}-\left(\frac{\varepsilon^{\prime}}{\left(\varepsilon^\prime\right)^2+\left(\varepsilon^{\prime\prime}\right)^2}\right)\frac{\omega_0}{\omega}\right]\,.$$

Provided that $\omega_0$ and $Q$ are known before hand, a measurement of the frequency dependence of $Z_\varepsilon$ can be used to determine $\varepsilon^\prime$ and $\varepsilon^{\prime\prime}$ of the material filling the gap of the LGR. This analysis gives the values of $\varepsilon^\prime$ and $\varepsilon^{\prime\prime}$ at the resonant frequency of the filled LGR.

=== Complex permeability ===
Next, suppose that the bore of a LGR is filled with a magnetic material have complex relative permeability $\mu_\mathrm{r}=\mu^\prime-j\mu^{\prime\prime}$. In this case, the effective inductance becomes $\mu_\mathrm{r}L$ and the impedance of the LGR is given by

$$Z_\mu = R+j\omega \left(\mu^\prime-j\mu^{\prime\prime}\right) L +\frac{1}{j\omega C}\,.$$

Separating $Z_\mu$ into its real and imaginary components and writing the impedance in terms of $\omega_0$ and $Q$ of the empty LGR yields

$$\frac{Z_\mu}{QR} = \left[\frac{1}{Q}+\mu^{\prime\prime}\frac{\omega}{\omega_0}\right]+j \left[\mu^\prime\frac{\omega}{\omega_0}-\frac{\omega_0}{\omega}\right]\,.$$

Once again, $\mu^{\prime\prime}$ contributes additional dissipation which lowers the quality factor of the filled resonator and $\mu^\prime$ shifts the resonant frequency. A measurement of the frequency dependence of $Z_\mu$ can be used to extract the values of $\mu^\prime$ and $\mu^{\prime\prime}$ at the resonant frequency of the filled LGR.
