= Coupling coefficient of resonators =

Dimensionless parameter

The coupling coefficient of resonators is a dimensionless value that characterizes interaction of two resonators. Coupling coefficients are used in resonator filter theory. Resonators may be both electromagnetic and acoustic. Coupling coefficients together with resonant frequencies and external quality factors of resonators are the generalized parameters of filters. In order to adjust the frequency response of the filter it is sufficient to optimize only these generalized parameters.

== Evolution of the term ==
This term was first introduced in filter theory by M Dishal. In some degree it is an analog of coupling coefficient of coupled inductors. Meaning of this term has been improved many times with progress in theory of coupled resonators and filters. Later definitions of the coupling coefficient are generalizations or refinements of preceding definitions.

=== Coupling coefficient considered as a positive constant ===
Earlier well-known definitions of the coupling coefficient of resonators are given in monograph by G. Matthaei et al. Note that these definitions are approximate because they were formulated in the assumption that the coupling between resonators is sufficiently small. The coupling coefficient $k$ for the case of two equal resonators is defined by formula

$k=|f_o-f_e|/f_0,$ (1)

where $f_e,$ $f_o$ are the frequencies of even and odd coupled oscillations of unloaded pair of the resonators and $f_0=\sqrt{f_ef_o}.$ It is obvious that the coupling coefficient defined by formula (2) is a positive constant that characterizes interaction of resonators at the resonant frequency $f_0.$

In case when an appropriate equivalent network having an impedance or admittance inverter loaded at both ports with resonant one-port networks may be matched with the pair of coupled resonators with equal resonant frequencies, the coupling coefficient $k$ is defined by the formula

$k=\frac{K_{12}}{\sqrt{x_1x_2}}$ (2)

for series-type resonators and by the formula

$k=\frac{J_{12}}{\sqrt{b_1b_2}}$ (3)

for parallel-type resonators. Here $K_{12},$ $J_{12}$ are impedance-inverter and admittance-inverter parameters, $x_1,$ $x_2$ are reactance slope parameters of the first and the second resonant series-type networks at resonant frequency $f_0,$ and $b_1,$ $b_2$ are the susceptance slope parameters of the first and the second resonant parallel-type networks.

When the resonators are resonant LC-circuits the coupling coefficient in accordance with (2) and (3) takes the value

$k_L=\frac{L_m}{\sqrt{L_1L_2}}$ (4)

for the circuits with inductive coupling and the value

$k_C=\frac{C_m}{\sqrt{(C_1+C_m)(C_2+C_m)}}.$ (5)

for the circuits with capacitive coupling. Here $L_1,$ $C_1$ are the inductance and the capacitance of the first circuit, $L_2,$ $C_2$ are the inductance and the capacitance of the second circuit, and $L_m,$ $C_m$ are mutual inductance and mutual capacitance. Formulas (4) and (5) are known for a long time in theory of electrical networks. They represent values of inductive and capacitive coupling coefficients of the coupled resonant LC-circuits.

=== Coupling coefficient considered as a constant having a sign ===
Refinement of the approximate formula (1) was fulfilled in. Exact formula has a form

$k=\frac{f_o^2-f_e^2}{f_o^2+f_e^2}.$ (6)

Formulae (4) and (5) were used while deriving this expression. Now formula (6) is universally recognized. It is given in highly cited monograph by J-S. Hong. It is seen that the coupling coefficient $k$ has a negative value if $f_o<f_e.$

In accordance with new definition (6), the value of the inductive coupling coefficient of resonant LC-circuits $k_L$ is expressed by formula (4) as before. It has a positive value when $L_m>0$ and a negative value when $L_m<0.$

Whereas the value of the capacitive coupling coefficient of resonant LC-circuits $k_C$ is always negative. In accordance with (6), the formula (5) for the capacitive coupling coefficient of resonant circuits takes a different form

$k_C=\frac{-C_m}{\sqrt{(C_1+C_m)(C_2+C_m)}}.$ (7)

Coupling between electromagnetic resonators may be realized both by magnetic or electric field. Coupling by magnetic field is characterized by the inductive coupling coefficient $k_L$ and coupling by electric field is characterized by the capacitive coupling coefficient $k_C.$ Usually absolute values of $k_L$ and $k_C$ monotonically decay when the distance between the resonators increases. Their decay rates may be different. However absolute value of their sum may both decay all over distance range and grow over some distance range.

Summation of the inductive and capacitive coupling coefficients is performed by formula

$k=\frac{k_L+k_C}{1+k_Lk_C}.$ (8)

This formula is derived from the definition (6) and formulas (4) and (7).

Note that the sign of the coupling coefficient $k$ itself is of no importance. Frequency response of the filter will not change if signs of all the coupling coefficients would be simultaneously alternated. However, the sign is important during collation of two coupling coefficients and especially during summation of inductive and capacitive coupling coefficients.

=== Coupling coefficient considered as a function of the forced oscillation frequency ===
Two coupled resonators may interact not only at the resonant frequencies. That is supported by ability to transfer energy of forced oscillations from one resonator to the other resonator. Therefore it would be more accurate to characterize interaction of resonators by a continuous function of forced-oscillation frequency $k(f)$ rather than set of constants $k_p$ where $p$ is order number of the resonance.

It is obvious that the function $k(f)$ must meet the condition

$k(f)|_{f=f_p}=k_p.$ (9)

Besides, the function $k(f)$ must become zero at those frequencies $f_z$ where transmission of high frequency power from one resonator to another one is absent, i.e. must meet the second condition

$k(f)|_{f=f_z}=0.$ (10)

The transmission zero arises in particularly in resonant circuits with mixed inductive-capacitive coupling when $L_m>0.$ Its frequency $k(f)$ is expressed by formula

$f_z=\frac{1}{2\pi}\sqrt{\frac{L_m}{(L_1L_2-L_m^2)C_m}}$.(11)

The definition of the function $k(f)$ that generalizes formula (6) and meets the conditions (9) and (10) was stated on energy-based approach in. This function is expressed by formula (8) through frequency-dependent inductive and capacitive coupling coefficients $k_L(f)$ and $k_C(f)$ defined by formulas

$k_L(f)=\frac{\dot{W}_{12L}(f)}{\sqrt{[\bar{W}_{11L}(f)+\bar{W}_{11C}(f)][\bar{W}_{22L}(f)+\bar{W}_{22C}(f)]}},$ (12)

$k_C(f)=\frac{\dot{W}_{12C}(f)}{\sqrt{[\bar{W}_{11L}(f)+\bar{W}_{11C}(f)][\bar{W}_{22L}(f)+\bar{W}_{22C}(f)]}}.$ (13)

Here $W$ denotes energy of high frequency electromagnetic field stored by both resonators. Bar over $W$ denotes static component of high frequency energy, and dot denotes amplitude of oscillating component of high frequency energy. Subscript $L$ denotes magnetic part of high frequency energy, and subscript $C$ denotes electric part of high frequency energy. Subscripts 11, 12 and 22 denote parts of stored energy that are proportional to $|U_1|^2,$ $|U_1||U_2|$ and $|U_2|^2$ where $U_1$ is complex amplitude of high frequency voltage at the first resonator port and $U_2$ is complex amplitude of voltage at the second resonator port.

Explicit functions of the frequency-dependent inductive and capacitive couplings for pair of coupled resonant circuits obtained from (12) and (13) have forms $k_L(f)=\frac{L_m}{\sqrt{L_1L_2}}\frac{2}{\sqrt{(1+f_1^{-2}f^2)(1+f_2^{-2}f^2)}},$ (14)

$k_C(f)=\frac{-C_m}{\sqrt{(C_1+C_m)(C_2+C_m)}}\frac{2}{\sqrt{(1+f_1^2f^{-2})(1+f_2^2f^{-2})}}$ (15)

where $f_1,$ $f_2$ are resonant frequencies of the first and the second circuit disturbed by couplings. It is seen that values of these functions at $f=f_1=f_2$ coincide with constants $k_L$ and $k_C$ defined by formulas (14) and (15). Besides, function $k(f)$ computed by formulae (8), (14) and (15) becomes zero at $f_z$ defined by formula (11).

== Coupling coefficients in filter theory ==
=== Bandpass filters with inline coupling topology ===
Theory of microwave narrow-band bandpass filters that have Chebyshev frequency response is stated in monograph. In these filters the resonant frequencies of all the resonators are tuned to the passband center frequency $f_0.$ Every resonator is coupled with two neighbor resonators at most. Each of two edge resonators is coupled with one neighbor resonator and one of two filter ports. Such the topology of resonator couplings is called inline one. There is only one path of microwave power transmission from the input port to the output port in filters with inline coupling topology.

Derivation of approximate formulas for the values of the coupling coefficients of neighbor resonators in filters with inline coupling topology $k_{i,i+1}$ those meet specified filter frequency response is given in. Here $i$ and $i+1$ are order numbers of the coupled resonators in the filter. The formulae were derived using low-pass prototype filters as well as formulae (2) and (3). Frequency response of the low-pass prototype filters is characterized by Chebyshev function of the first kind. The formulas were first published in. They have a form

$k_{i,i+1}=\frac{f_2-f_1}{\sqrt{f_1f_2g_ig_{i+1}}},$ (16)

where $g_i$ $(i=0,1,2...n)$ are normalized prototype element values, $n$ is order of the Chebyshev function which is equal to the number of the resonators, $f_1,$ $f_2$ are the band-edge frequencies.

Prototype element values $g_i$ for a specified bandpass of the filter are computed by formulas

$g_0=1,$ $g_1=2a_1/\gamma,$

$g_i=\frac{4a_{i-1}a_i}{b_{i-1}g_{i-1}}, (i=2,3,...n),$ (17)

$g_{n+1}=1,$ if $n$ is even,

$g_{n+1}=\mathrm{coth}^2(\beta/4),$ if $n$ is odd.

Here the next notations were used

$\beta=2\mathrm{artanh}\sqrt{10^{-\Delta L/10}},$ $\gamma=\mathrm{sh}(\frac{\beta}{2n}),$ (18)

$a_i=\mathrm{sin}\frac{(2i-1)\pi}{2n},$ $b_i=\gamma^2+\mathrm{sin}^2(\frac{i\pi}{n}), (i=1,2,...n),$

where $\Delta L$ is the required passband ripple in dB.

Formulas (16) are approximate not only because of the approximate definitions (2) and (3) for coupling coefficients were used. Exact expressions for the coupling coefficients in prototype filter were obtained in. However both former and refined formulae remain approximate in designing practical filters. The accuracy depends on both filter structure and resonator structure. The accuracy improves when the fractional bandwidth narrows.

Inaccuracy of formulas (16) and their refined version is caused by the frequency dispersion of the coupling coefficients that may varies in a great degree for different structures of resonators and filters. In other words, the optimal values of the coupling coefficients $k_{i,i+1}$ at frequency $f_0$ depend on both specifications of the required passband and values of the derivatives $dk_{i,i+1}/df|_{f=f_0}.$ That means the exact values of the coefficients $k_{i,i+1}$ ensuring the required passband can not be known beforehand. They may be established only after filter optimization. Therefore, the formulas (16) may be used to determine initial values of the coupling coefficients before optimization of the filter.

The approximate formulas (16) allow also to ascertain a number of universal regularities concerning filters with inline coupling topology. For example, widening of current filter passband requires approximately proportional increment of all the coupling coefficients $k_{i,i+1}.$ The coefficients $k_{i,i+1}$ are symmetrical with respect to the central resonator or the central pair of resonators even in filters having unequal characteristic impedances of transmission lines in the input and output ports. Value of the coefficient $k_{i,i+1}$ monotonically decreases with moving from the external pairs of resonators to the central pair.

Real microwave filters with inline coupling topology as opposed to their prototypes may have transmission zeroes in stopbands. Transmission zeroes considerably improve filter selectivity. One of the reasons why zeroes arise is frequency dispersion of coupling coefficients $k_{i,i+1}$ for one or more pairs of resonators expressing in their vanishing at frequencies of transmission zeroes.

=== Bandpass filters with cross couplings ===
In order to generate transmission zeroes in stopbands for the purpose to improve filter selectivity, a number of supplementary couplings besides the nearest couplings are often made in the filters. They are called cross couplings. These couplings bring to foundation of several wave paths from the input port to the output port. Amplitudes of waves transmitted through different paths may compensate themselves at some separate frequencies while summing at the output port. Such the compensation results in transmission zeroes.

In filters with cross couplings, it is convenient to characterize all filter couplings as a whole using a coupling matrix $\mathbf M$ of dimension $n\times n$,. It is symmetrical. Every its off-diagonal element $M_{ij}$ is the coupling coefficient of ith and jth resonators $k_{ij}.$ Every diagonal element $M_{ii}$ is the normalized susceptance of the ith resonator. All diagonal elements $M_{ii}$ in a tuned filter are equal to zero because a susceptance vanishes at the resonant frequency.

Important merit of the matrix $\mathbf M$ is the fact that it allows to directly compute the frequency response of the equivalent network having the inductively coupled resonant circuits,. Therefore it is convenient to use this matrix when designing the cross-coupled filters. The coupling matrices $\mathbf M$, in particular, are used as coarse models of filters. Utilization of a coarse model allows to quicken filter optimization manyfold because of computation of the frequency response for the coarse model does not consume CPU time with respect to computation for the real filter.

== Coupling coefficient in terms of the vector fields ==
Because the coupling coefficient is a function of both the mutual inductance and capacitance, it can also be expressed in terms of the vector fields $\mathbf E$ and $\mathbf H$. Hong proposed that the coupling coefficient is the sum of the normalized overlap integrals

$\kappa = \kappa_E+\kappa_M,$ (19)

where

$\kappa_E=\frac{\int_V \epsilon \mathbf{E}_1\dot\mathbf{E}_2 dv}{\sqrt{\int_V \epsilon|\mathbf{E}_1|^2 dv\times\int_V \epsilon |\mathbf{E}_2|^2 dv}}$(20)

and

$\kappa_M=\frac{\int_V \mu \mathbf{H}_1\dot\mathbf{H}_2 dv}{\sqrt{\int_V \epsilon|\mathbf{E}_1|^2 dv\times\int_V \epsilon |\mathbf{E}_2|^2 dv}}.$(21)

On the contrary, based on a coupled mode formalism, Awai and Zhang derived expressions for $\kappa$ which is in favor of using the negative sign i.e.,

$\kappa=\kappa_M-\kappa_E.$ (22)

Formulae (19) and (22) are approximate. They match the exact formula (8) only in case of a weak coupling. Formulae (20) and (21) in contrast to formulas (12) and (13) are approximate too because they do not describe a frequency dispersion which may often manifest itself in a form of transmission zeros in frequency response of a multi-resonator bandpass filter.

Using Lagrange's equation of motion, it was demonstrated that the interaction between two split-ring resonators, which form a meta-dimer, depends on the difference between the two terms. In this case, the coupled energy was expressed in terms of the surface charge and current densities.

Recently, based on Energy Coupled Mode Theory (ECMT), a coupled mode formalism in the form of an eigenvalue problem, it was shown that the coupling coefficient is indeed the difference between the magnetic and electric components $\kappa_M$ and $\kappa_E$. Using Poynting's theorem in its microscopic form, it was shown that $\kappa$ can be expressed in terms of the interaction energy between the resonators' modes.
