= GDO =

GDO may refer to:

- Godoberi language
- Gordon railway station, Sydney, in Australia
- Grid dip oscillator
- Guasdualito Airport, in Venezuela
