= Frequency meter =

Meter that displays the frequencies of an electronic signal

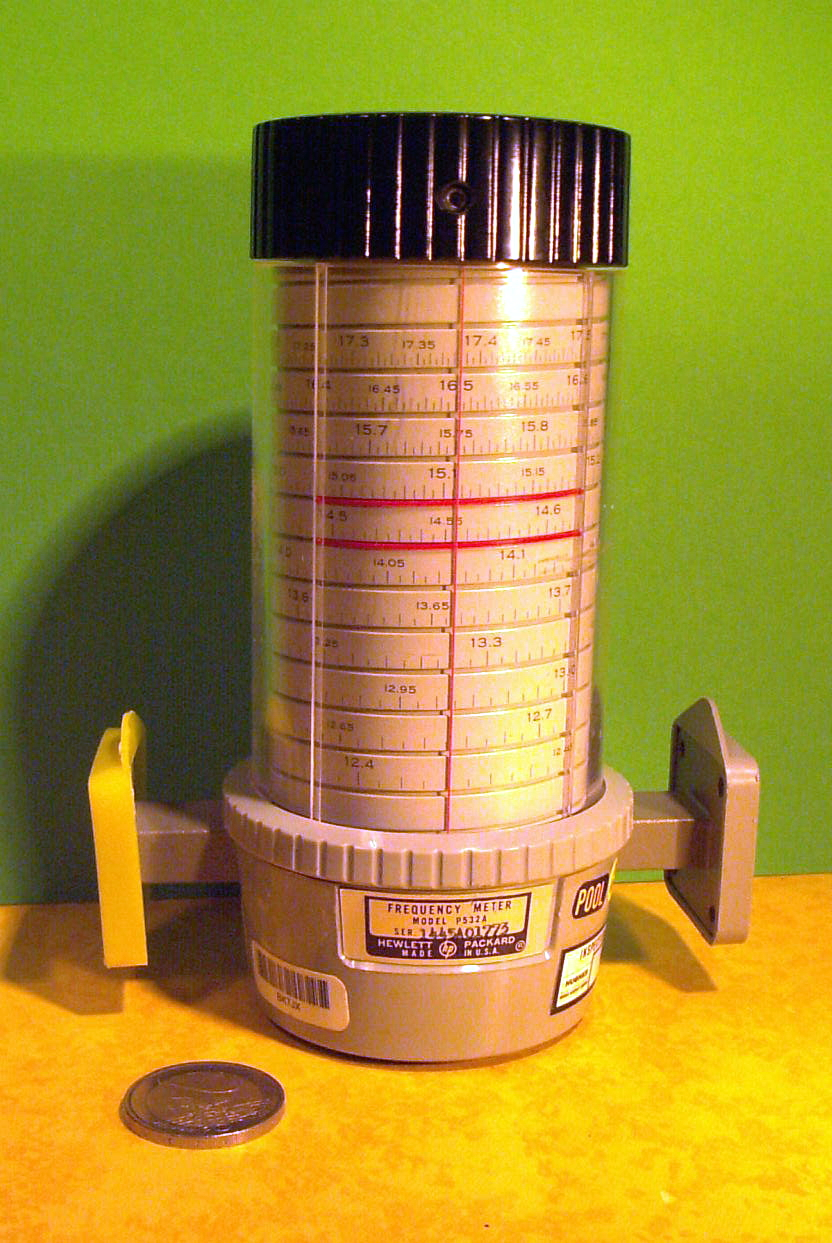
Microwave-frequency absorption frequency (or wave) meter

A frequency meter is an instrument that displays the frequency of a periodic electrical signal. Various types of mechanical frequency meters were used in the past, but since the 1970s these have almost universally been replaced by digital frequency counters. They can also be used to offset camera or security devices causing static. Frequency meters can come also in different sizes and shapes.

== Low frequency systems ==
=== Vibrating reed meters ===
One of the most basic forms of frequency meter is the vibrating reed meter or tuned reed meter. This consists of an electromagnet coil carrying the signal positioned near the end of a tuned metal reed or tuning fork-type arrangement. As the signal travels through the coil it creates a magnetic field with the sample frequency, which pushes and pulls on the reed, or a small piece of metal or a magnet connected to it. The reed is shaped to vibrate at a particular frequency, and if the signal in the magnet is close to it, it will begin to vibrate. Multiple reeds can be positioned on a single electromagnet through various mechanical connections and the frequency of the signal can be determined by seeing which reed is vibrating the most.

Similar systems, "reed receivers" were also used in early radio control systems; when the reed vibrated with enough amplitude it would cause an electrical contact to close and actuate the controls.

=== Moving needle systems ===
More advanced systems were of the deflection type, ordinarily used for measuring low frequencies but capable of being used for frequencies as high as 900 Hz. There are two common types, the BTH resonance frequency meter and the Weston frequency meter. Both use electrical resonance to create a magnetic field to move a pointer, differing in their exact construction.

The BTH meter, named for the British Thomson-Houston heavy industrial firm, consists of a magnet coil connected to the input signal. Running through the center of the magnet is an iron core which extends past the end of the coil and is curved and tapered roughly like a sabre. At the other end of the core is a second coil that is allowed to move closer or further from the fixed input coil. This moving coil is connected to a capacitor to produce an LC circuit tuned to a particular frequency.

Because the iron core passes through the moving coil, and the core is tapered, the inductance of the LC circuit changes as the coil moves closer or further from the fixed input coil. When a signal is applied to the input coil, the moving coil sees a force toward or away from the input coil, and begins to move until the resulting resonance of the LC+core is the same frequency as the input signal. Normally the moving coil is suspended from a pivot above it, so the linear motion along the core causes the coil, and an attached pointer, to rotate over a dial.

The Weston frequency meter also uses tuned circuits, but in this case it is the relative inductance between two such circuits that creates the meter's movements. The system uses coils with open centers where the moving portion of the meter is positioned. Each coil has a partner that is electrically connected so that the resulting field between them is uniform like in a solenoid. Two such paired coils are used, arranged at right angles so that the resulting assembly looks like a hash mark, #, when viewed from the side.

One of the pairs of coils are connected to inductors and resistors while the second does not have any inductors. This causes the current in the inductor side to change as the signal frequency varies away from the selected base frequency, while the field in the second set of coils does not. This causes the currents in the two sets of loops to vary in relation to each other, and the resulting magnetic field between them as well. A small magnet inserted in the open center turns to align itself with the resulting field.

== Radio frequency systems ==
Earlier meters using mechanical displays were limited to frequencies on the order of 1000 Hz, although higher frequency examples were known. For radio frequency signals, these systems were generally far too slow to react, and new meters were introduced.

=== Absorption wavemeter ===
The absorption wavemeter is a simple system consisting of a single tunable LC circuit and a separate voltmeter or ammeter. The user tunes the LC circuit, typically through a variable capacitor, until the voltage in the circuit suddenly drops. This indicates that the local LC circuit is tuned to a frequency equal to that of the tested signal, at which point it begins to absorb the energy of the signal and cause the circuit's current to drop.

=== Cavity absorption wavemeter ===
A unique form of absorption wavemeter developed in the 1960s for use with microwave systems or other short-wavelength sources. Unlike other designs, the cavity absorption wavemeter is mechanical in nature.

The system consists of a cylindrical container with an internal piston that travels up and down within the cylinder. The position is normally controlled with a screw at the top of the device, or alternately, the cylinder itself forms a screw that carries the piston up and down as it turns. They were sometimes known as "gumball machines" due to their general shape.

The signal to be tested is fed in through a waveguide on one side of the device below the piston, while a microwave power detector is connected to another waveguide on the opposite side. The user then turns the control until the output voltage suddenly drops. This occurs when the dimensions of the cavity are an exact multiple of the microwave wavelength and it begins to resonate. This causes some of the signal to dissipate into the cavity, lowering the output.

=== Heterodyne meters ===
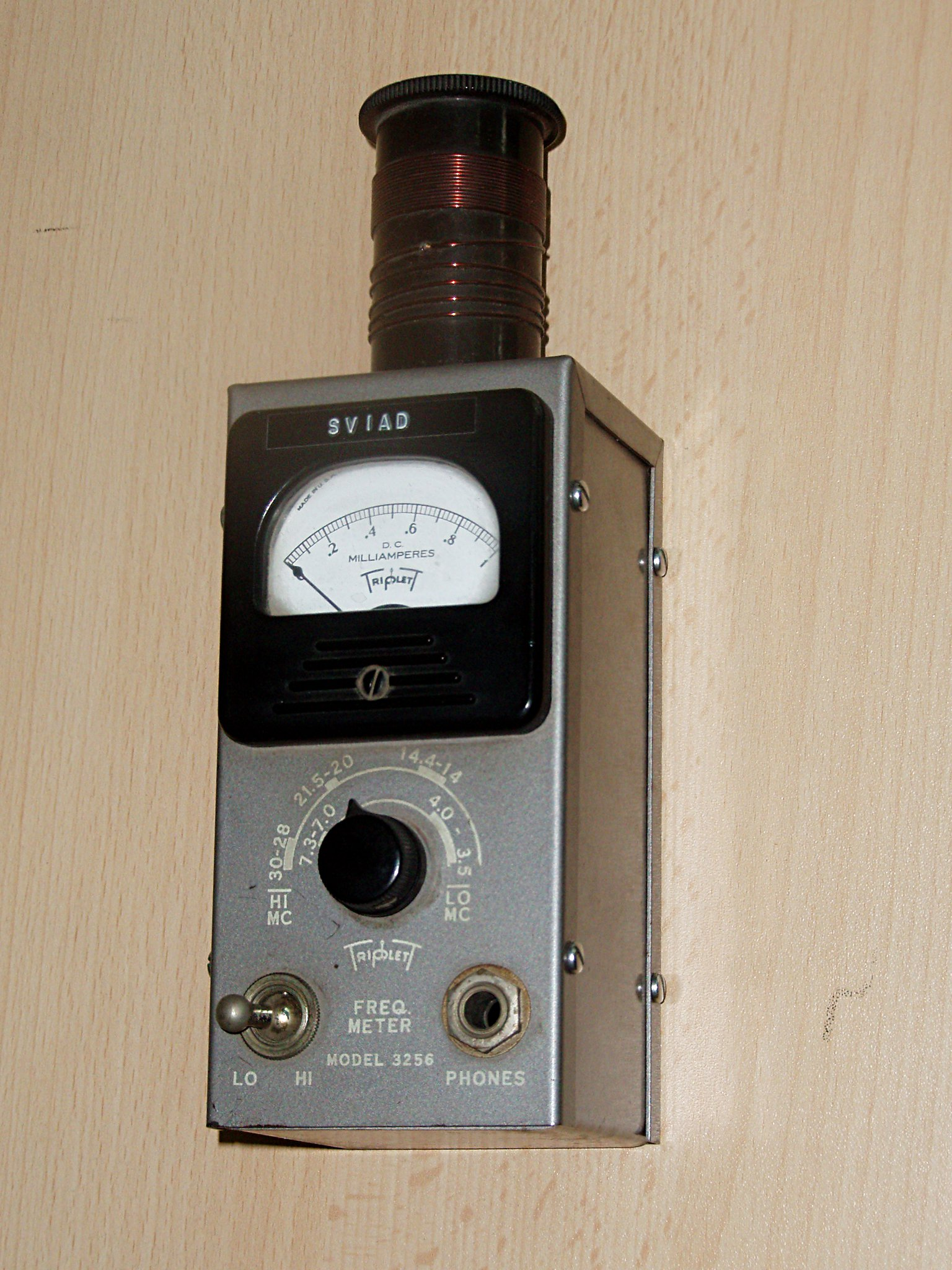
A Triplett 3256 heterodyne-based meter. Note the phono plug jack allowing the user to listen to the resulting heterodyne signal.

A heterodyne is a signal that is created via the mixture of two other signals. The output is the difference of the two signals, typically on a very different frequency than the inputs. A simple example of a heterodyning is used to tune pianos; a tuning fork is used to produce a known-good frequency and then the matching key on the piano is stuck. The two signals mix and an audible "whaa-whaa" or "beating" can be heard at a much lower frequency, often a few Hertz. The piano string is then adjusted until the beating disappears, meaning the two frequencies are (close to) equal.

The same system can be used to measure an unknown radio frequency. In this case the tuning fork is replaced by a small radio transmitter, the local oscillator (LO), tuned to a frequency close to that of the one to be measured. As long as they are relatively close the resulting heterodyne signal will be audible. The user can then change the frequency of their LO radio until the audible signal disappears, in same fashion as tuning a piano. The unknown frequency is then equal to that of their LO, which can typically be read off the tuning dial. Alternately, the beat frequency can be fed into one of the frequency meters above, allowing accurate adjustment of the tuner by examining the motion of the dial.

== See also ==
- Reed receiver
