= Mode =

Mode (Latin: modus meaning "manner, tune, measure, due measure, rhythm, melody") may refer to:

== Arts and entertainment ==
- MODE (magazine), a defunct U.S. women's fashion magazine
- Mode magazine, a fictional fashion magazine which is the setting for the ABC series Ugly Betty
- Mode (video game), a 1996 video game
- Mode Records, a record label
- Mode Media, a defunct digital media company
- Mode (book series), a quartet of novels by Piers Anthony
- Modern Organization for Dance Evolvement, known as MODE, a 1970s modern dance organisation in New York
- Mode, a defunct Indonesian women's magazine

=== Music ===
- Mode (music), a system of musical tonality involving a type of scale coupled with a set of characteristic melodic behaviors
  - Modus (medieval music)
    - Gregorian mode, a system of modes used in Gregorian chant (as opposed to ancient Greek modes or Byzantine octoechos)
- "Mode", a song by PRhyme from the 2015 soundtrack Southpaw: Music from and Inspired by the Motion Picture
- The Mode (album), a 1962 album by Sonny Red

== Computing ==
- MODE (command), a DOS and Windows command line utility for the configuration of devices and the console
- Mode (user interface), distinct method of operation within a computer system, in which the same user input can produce different results depending on the state of the system
  - A game mode, a mode used as a game mechanic in video games
  - Digital camera modes
  - Direct mode, a software configuration where text input is processed outside of an application
  - Immediate mode (computer graphics), a graphic library where commands produce direct rendering on the display
- Modes (Unix), permissions given to users and groups to access files and folders on Unix hosts

== Language ==
- Grammatical mood, also known as mode, a category of verbal inflections that expresses an attitude of mind
  - Imperative mood
  - Subjunctive mood
- Mode (literature), the general category of a literary work, e.g. the pastoral mode
- Rhetorical modes, a category of discourse
  - Narrative mode, the type of method voice and point of view used to convey a narrative
  - Modes of persuasion, oratorical devices

== Mathematics ==
- Mode (statistics), the most common value among a group
- Modes of convergence, a property of a series

== Places ==
- Mode, Banmauk, a village in Burma
- Mode, Illinois, an unincorporated community in Shelby County, Illinois, United States

== Science ==
- Mode (electromagnetism), a pattern of wave propagation.
  - Longitudinal mode
  - Transverse mode
  - Hybrid mode, such as longitudinal-section mode
- Normal mode, patterns of vibration in acoustics, electromagnetic theory, etc.
- Global mode, a concept in hydrodynamics
- Quasinormal mode, a type of energy dissipation of a perturbed object or field
- Starvation mode, a biological condition

== Other uses ==
- Amateur radio modes
- Fashion
- IL Mode, a former name of Bærum SK, a Norwegian association football club
- Mode of transport, a means of transportation
- A technocomplex of stone tools
- Mode of production, a Marxist term for way of producing goods
- HSwMS Mode, several ships of the Swedish Navy

== See also ==
- Asynchronous Transfer Mode, a method of digital communication
- Block cipher mode of operation, in cryptography
- The Devil's Mode, a collection of short stories by Anthony Burgess
- Edna Mode, a fictional character in Pixar's animated superhero film The Incredibles
- Explosive Mode, a 1998 album by San Quinn and Messy Marv
- Modal (disambiguation)
- Modality (disambiguation)
- Switch mode (disambiguation)
