= Switch (disambiguation) =

In electricity, a switch is a device that can connect, disconnect, or divert current in an electrical circuit.

Switch or The Switch may also refer to:

== Sport ==
- Switch (basketball), change of defensive assignments during a play
- Switch (pickleball), a call, made by one doubles partner to the other, to switch sides
- Switch hitter, a baseball player who can bat left- and right-handed
- Switch stance, riding a skateboard, snowboard or other device in the direction not preferred by the rider
- Switch, a mascot of the Tohoku Rakuten Golden Eagles

== Technology ==
=== Computing ===
- Switch (app), for job searching
- Switch (command line), a directive added to a text command to modify its behavior
- switch statement, a programming language statement which controls program flow
- Context switch, performed by an operating system in response to an interrupt
- Packet switch, a component in a packet-switched data network
  - Network switch, a computer networking device that uses a form of packet switching
- Switch access, the use of custom devices to make computing available to people with severe physical or cognitive impairment
- Payment Switch, an application that switches payment transactions between issuers and acquirers
- PCI Express switch, a switch hardware used for the PCI Express bus

=== Other ===
- Glock switch, a small device that can be attached to the rear of the slide of a Glock handgun, converting the semi-automatic pistol into a machine pistol capable of fully automatic fire
- SWITCH Information Technology Services, the Swiss education and research network
- Telephone switch, the central part of a telephone system
- Railroad switch, a mechanical installation that creates a junction between multiple railroad tracks
  - and related wire switches, on trolley wires
- Switched-mode power supply

== As a proper name ==
=== Brands and enterprises ===
- Switch (company), a Nevada-based telecommunications company
- Switch (debit card), introduced in the UK in 1988 and later renamed Maestro
- Switchdigital, an operator of DAB ensembles in the UK
- Switch Mobility, manufacturer of electric buses, owned by Ashok Leyland
- Switch Press, an imprint of Capstone Publishers
- Switch (beverage) a sparkling juice often sold in schools

=== Arts and entertainment ===
==== Film ====
- Switch (1991 film), an American comedy by Blake Edwards
- Switch (2007 film), a Norwegian snowboard drama
- Switch (2011 film), a French action film
- Switch (2012 film), an American documentary about alternative energy
- Switch (2013 film), a Chinese action film
- Switch (2023 film), a South Korean comedy drama film
- The Switch (1963 film), a British crime drama
- The Switch (2010 film), an American romantic comedy
- The Switch (2022 film), a Canadian drama film directed by Michel Kandinsky
- The Switch, a 1993 American film about Larry McAfee and Dr. Russ Fine
- Switch, a character in the Matrix franchise
- Switch, a character from the South African animated film Seal Team

==== Games ====
- Switch (card game), a shedding-type game
- Nintendo Switch, a hybrid video game console
- 1-2-Switch, a 2017 Nintendo Switch party game
- Everybody 1-2-Switch!, a 2023 Nintendo Switch party game

==== Literature and periodicals ====
- Switch (manga), a Japanese manga series by Otoh Saki and Tomomi Nakamura
- Switch (2018 manga), a Japanese basketball-themed manga by Atsushi Namikiri
- The Switch, a 1978 novel by Elmore Leonard
- Switch, a 1998 novel by Carol Guess
- Switch (Mexican magazine), a music magazine
- Switch (Romanian magazine), an LGBT magazine

==== Music ====
===== Performers =====
- Switch (band), an American R&B/funk band
- Switches (band), a 2000s English rock band
- DJ Switch (disambiguation), several DJs

===== Albums =====
- Switch (Golden Earring album) or the title song, "The Switch", 1975
- Switch (INXS album), 2005
- Switch (Switch album), 1978
- Switch (EP), by Schaft, 1994
- The Switch (Body/Head album), 2018
- The Switch (Emily King album) or the title song, 2015

===== Songs =====
- "Switch" (Fluke song), 2003
- "Switch" (Howie B song), 1997
- "Switch" (Iggy Azalea song), 2017
- "Switch" (Lisa song), 2004
- "Switch" (Will Smith song), 2005
- "Switch", by 6lack from East Atlanta Love Letter, 2018
- "Switch", by Afrojack and Jewelz & Sparks, 2019
- "Switch", by Ashley Tisdale from Guilty Pleasure, 2009
- "Switch", by the American band Bright from their self-titled album
- "Switch", by the Cure from 4:13 Dream, 2008
- "Switch", by Rose Gray from Louder Please, 2025
- "Switch", by Roy Woods from Waking at Dawn, 2016
- "Switch", by Siouxsie & the Banshees from The Scream, 1978
- "Switch", by Sugababes from Angels with Dirty Faces, 2002
- "The Switch", by Planet Funk from Non Zero Sumness, 2002

==== Television ====
===== Series =====
- Switch (American TV series), a 1970s series starring Robert Wagner and Eddie Albert
- Switch (British TV series), a 2012 supernatural comedy-drama series
- Switch (South Korean TV series), a 2018 series
- Switch, a 1997 German version of the Australian series Fast Forward
- The Switch (TV series), a Canadian sitcom
- The Switch Drag Race, a Chilean reality competition series
- Switch (game show), a 2023 American game show

===== Episodes =====
- "Switch" (Better Call Saul)
- "Switch" (NCIS)
- "The Switch" (Kappa Mikey)
- "The Switch" (The Rookie)
- "The Switch" (Seinfeld)

===== Other content =====
- BBC Switch, a 2007–2010 brand for content aimed at UK teenagers
- Switch? (The Price Is Right), a pricing game on The Price Is Right

== Other uses ==
- Switch (advertising campaign), a 2002 campaign by Apple
- Switch (BDSM), a person who switches between dominant and submissive sex roles
- Switch (corporal punishment), a flexible wooden rod used for punishment
- The switch (con), a type of swindle

== See also ==
- Switched (disambiguation)
- Switching (disambiguation)
- Code-switching (disambiguation)
- Switch mode (disambiguation)
