= Midnight Stranger =

Midnight Stranger (1994) is the first of two published interactive multimedia CD-ROM–based collaborations between writer and director Jeff Green and the Animatics Multimedia Corporation. Noted for its cinéma vérité style, it is a Point Of View (POV) video-based experiment in simulated socializing that takes place in an anonymous city late one night. Players navigate between several locations, and can interact with one or more people in each location to varying effects based on the player's "reactions" to that person. The main technical innovation of Midnight Stranger is its use of an emotional continuum Mood Bar for interaction with the in-story characters rather than a text interface or an itemized set of options for each interaction. The Mood Bar simulates some of the frustration and uncertainty when dealing with other people in social situations, and provides a more realistic role playing experience.

== Gameplay ==
The major technical innovation of the game is its user interface which consists of a continuous coloured band called the Mood Bar that appears below the characters when they pause in the “dialogue” for user input. The red, left end of the bar represents a negative response ("no", "I disagree", "I don’t like that"), the blue central part of the band represents a neutral response ("I don’t know", "I don’t care", "I have no opinion"), and the green right end of the bar represents a positive response ("yes", "I agree", "I like that"). While the bar is a smooth colour gradient that shows no clear demarcations, giving the illusion of infinite choice, there were usually only three possible pathways from any given bar, with varying percentages of the bar devoted to the choices depending on circumstance. Only one other production has been published using this device (Mode, 1995).

Navigation is primarily between still images of street scenes and building fronts. Moving the mouse raised a small "GO" icon in directions you may progress, bringing up another still image location. Some of these icons appear on entrances to public locations; a movie theatre, restaurants, clubs, etc. Clicking on these takes you to an interior scene including people. Rolling over some of these people raised a "TALK" icon, indicating that clicking on them will instigate a "conversation".

Because of disc size restrictions at the time of creation there was a serious limitation in the amount of video content that could be included on a disc. To accommodate this and still have enough material to constitute a viable product, Green conceived of a technique for embedding small frames of video into full screen still frames, usually the head and shoulders of the speaking character being the only part of the frame that moved. This approach was both lauded and criticized in published reviews, since it is a clever solution yet often creates distracting disjoints between character motion and the framing image.

Midnight Stranger has eighteen onscreen performers with varying depths of content. Only three of the characters are involved in a plot that can lead to various "endings", involving a supernatural object of extraterrestrial origin. In an effort to create a filmic feel, a feature causes that after a given amount of time (about sixty minutes) in game play the "relationship" with any character will lead to an "ending" that triggers the credits. If you manage to find the object there are several scenes where an icon appears representing the object. If you click the icon a brief special effect ensues, depending on the circumstance.

The overarching concept is that "you" are a stranger in a late-night city who engages random people in conversation, on the street, in bars, clubs or restaurants. These conversations, dictated by Mood Bar choices, can lead to dead ends or various "fulfillments", depending on the character. Three of the female characters can lead to short sex encounters with minimal (waist-up) nudity. The disc was given an "adults-only" rating mostly because of the extremely strong language, mostly delivered by one character ("The Hood").

== Development ==
In 1992 the Animatics Multimedia Corporation, founded by Alfredo Coppola and Simon Goodwin, was a middle-level computer graphics and multimedia purveyor for Ottawa corporations and Canadian government departments. Through a friendship with Jeff Green they were allowing him to use their graphics hardware to produce animation for his television show "Cowboy Who?". When Goodwin came up with an idea for a social video-based interactive "game" they called on Green to help them develop the idea and to write and direct the final product. Using friends, they produced a brief demo and began shopping it to multimedia publishers. After several false starts they finally established a relationship with Gazelle Technologies, a San Diego–based company primarily associated with mail order CD-ROM distribution, and began the production process. Originally Green wrote a complicated multi-layer script that would have called for hundreds of hours of final footage, but when he began the auditions he became fascinated with the extraordinary life stories the (predominantly inexperienced) applicants told him, and he decided on a different direction that would use their life stories in improvised performances. Locations were selected and, in June 1993, Green began the shooting using a Sony Hi-8 handycam, sometimes doing all set preparation and lighting himself. Principal photography was completed in July 1993 and Goodwin began the programming. A beta version was presented at the Macromedia International User's Conference in San Francisco, September 1993, where it won a People's Choice Award, and the first Mac consumer version was released in November of that year. A PC version followed in early 1994.

== Awards ==
- 1993 – Macromedia People's Choice Award, San Francisco, Macromedia International User's Conference
- 1995 – Murphy Award for Best Story in an Interactive Multimedia Title, March 1995, Electronic Entertainment

== Cast and crew ==
- Created by Simon Goodwin and Jeff Green
- Written and directed by Jeff Green
- Produced by Alfredo Coppola and the Animatics Multimedia Corporation
- First published by Gazelle Technologies of San Diego.
- Programming: Simon Goodwin
- Music: Randy Kay
- Editing: Andreas Ua'Siaghail and Wendy Goodwin
- Production Assistant: Eileen Keefe
- Lighting: Mike Tien
- Make-up: Sue Upton and Sam Caldwell
- Cast: Julie R., Kevin Pickles, Linda Armstrong, Rick Kalbars, Lyle Burwell, Nicki Brodie, Alfredo Coppola, Andrea Robertson, Bernadette Hendrickx, Caitlin Fisher, Christine Short, Christopher McLeod, Henry Gauthier, Janet Kearns, Jeff Lefebvre, Randy Kay, Rick Cancino, Lisa Constantine, Ted MacLeod, Carrie L.Fisher, Gary Taite

== Reception ==
Overall Midnight Stranger was well-reviewed in the literature, but was never reprinted after its initial release and never achieved anything except mail order availability. Its critical success did lead to an association of Green and Animatics with the Ottawa-based Corel Corporation, which financed an elaborate follow-up CD-ROM (Mode) and associated web-based version ("Club Mode").

- CD-ROM Magazine (Vol. 5 Issue 1): "This is a landmark game: unlike any other computer game, this really does start to feel like real life... this could well be the way first person adventure games will go..."
- NewMedia Magazine (Sept. 1994, Reed Rahlmann): "Midnight Stranger is particularly successful at showing the frustrations of social interaction... There is good replay ability... The many characters are not fleshed out; most play along one emotional note or narrative. And the sexual encounters are for heterosexual men. Still, the design is clever enough to carry anyone along for the ride. The navigation is speedy and the pacing satisfying. This is one weird city!"
- CDROM World (Oct. 1994, Todd Harris): "This adults-only urban drama has all the elements of a kitschy classic: psychos, rude bartenders, and bad production values. An interesting but failed experiment."
- CDROM Today (Oct. 1994, David Wade): "The problem with Midnight Stranger is the shortfall between the ambitions of its conceptual reach and what finally ends up within its aesthetic grasp... Midnight Stranger deserves good marks for attempting some ingenious solutions to the problems of digital world building. And a rap over the knuckles for not making up its mind about what it intended to do."
- Campus Canada (Nov. 1994, Drew Carnwath): "often hilarious, occasionally unexpected, but almost always true-to-life... The creators of MS deserve kudos for dialogue that is extremely funny, intelligent, and, well, REAL... and much credit goes, too, to the actors who bring the characters to life... Technically, MS is truly a trip... the quality of the images and the fidelity of the soundscape combine to create a total experience ... Slick yet gritty, mysterious yet revealing; it is the first computer game wherein the player can learn something about himself..."
- NewMedia Magazine (Dec. 1994, "Holiday Picks, 50 CD-ROM Titles"): "A journey of vicarious urban thrills that include sex, crime, and alien encounters."
- American Way Magazine (Dec. 15, 1994, "1994’s Best CD-ROMs"): "the editors of NewMedia Magazine give us their top ten CD-ROM picks for the first year of the digital revolution ... the greatest achievement, we think, is the mood this title creates — a dark, urban attitude in a place where a lot of people might not go, but would like to visit from the armchair."
- Gasperini, Jim (December 1994). "Virtual Loneliness". Wired. Archived from the original on October 1, 1999. "Though still a little raw, Midnight Stranger is the first use of an ambitious approach to interactive drama. It has the flavor of close collaboration with a talented group of actors, and as such gives a sense of what theatre people might do with the interactive medium... At its best the writing neatly 'samples' what would in reality be a lengthy conversation, creating a naturally flowing sense of high point and ellipsis. But the structure's potential has not been fully utilized. The story to which all this cleverness is applied ends up being about as meaningful as an evening spent cruising singles bars. The overall approach is interesting enough, though; the next title using it should be something to look forward to."
- Axcess Magazine (Vol.II, No.5, Matt Foley): "The best thing about Midnight Stranger is that it is not really a game; there is an interesting story going on behind the scenes, but you can do whatever you want. This disk is like going out on the town with no set plans, only a vague mission to have fun."
- Computer Gaming World (Oct.'94, Eden Maxwell, "Relationships That Pass In The Night"): "Mature audiences will find themselves captivated by Midnight Stranger from the opening screen... What distinguishes Stranger is an intelligent script that elevates characters from objects to people you develop feelings for ... Directing the characters, including yourself, in this free form cinema verité experiment is exciting and habit forming..."
- Electronic Entertainment (Mar. 1995, James Daly): "Midnight Stranger isn’t perfect, but if offers an intriguing glimpse of how multimedia games can move beyond glorified cartoons. The game can be gritty, frustrating, and sometimes just plain weird; but it delivers enough intrigue and hidden surprises to keep anyone interested... And the disc never plays the same twice."
- Nautilus CD (Feb. 1995, Steve Stein): "I cannot recommend this game too highly. If you’re not offended by the content, pick up a copy. There's nothing like it."
- Shift (Winter 1995, Jeremy Lowell): "Admittedly, the CD-ROM is sometimes chauvinistic, cheesy and the acting amateurish. But on the whole it is relentlessly compelling. Role-playing has never been this realistic. And combined with the voyeuristic quality of the environment and the bizarre cast of characters, MS truly redefines the term interactive — for the better."
- A for Adventure website (http://www.a-for-adventure.com/gamereview.php?id=269): "In short, this is one of the best multimedia games of its time."
- Just Adventure (May 2004, "Review of Midnight Stranger").
- Ottawa Citizen (March 10, 1994, "A high-tech stumble through the city at midnight").
