= Transit time =

Transit time may refer to:

- Human gastrointestinal transit time in biology
- The time for a radar reflection to return
- Sun transit time, the time at which the sun passes over the observer's meridian line
- The transit time factor for an acceleration voltage, used in accelerator physics
- In breath gas analysis, the delay between a gas sample being removed from the patient circuit and the sample being analyzed by a machine
- A residence time for flow through a system
- Duration of a commute
- Duration required for freight transport
