= Linear mode =

Linear mode may refer to:

- Linear address mode
- Linear amplifier
- Linear mode (FET)
- Linear mode (JFET)
- Linear mode (MOSFET)
- Linear power supply

== See also ==
- Linear system
- Normal mode
- Linear (disambiguation)
- Mode (disambiguation)
- Switch mode (disambiguation)
