= Portner =

Portner is a surname. Notable people with the surname include:

- Abby Portner (born 1980), American musician
- David Portner (born 1979), American musician, known as Avey Tare
- Emil Pørtner (born 2000), Danish motorcycle speedway rider
- Emma Portner (born 1994), Canadian dancer and choreographer
- Margit Pörtner (1972–2017), Danish curler
- Nikola Portner (born 1993), Swiss handball player
- Paul Portner (born 1966), American linguist
- Peer Portner (1940–2009), heart researcher
- Robert Portner (1837–1906), American brewer
- Zlatko Portner (1962–2020), Serbian handball player and coach
