= Acceleration voltage =

Term in accelerator physics

In accelerator physics, the term acceleration voltage means the effective voltage surpassed by a charged particle along a defined straight line. If not specified further, the term is likely to refer to the longitudinal effective acceleration voltage $V_\parallel$.

The acceleration voltage is an important quantity for the design of microwave cavities for particle accelerators. See also shunt impedance.

For the special case of an electrostatic field that is surpassed by a particle, the acceleration voltage is directly given by integrating the electric field along its path. The following considerations are generalized for time-dependent fields.

== Longitudinal voltage ==
The longitudinal effective acceleration voltage is given by the kinetic energy gain experienced by a particle with velocity $\beta c$ along a defined straight path (path integral of the longitudinal Lorentz forces) divided by its charge,

$V_\parallel(\beta) = \frac 1 q \vec e_s \cdot \int \vec F_L(s,t) \,\mathrm{d}s = \frac 1 q \vec e_s \cdot \int \vec F_L(s, t = \frac{s}{\beta c}) \,\mathrm d s$.

For resonant structures, e.g. SRF cavities, this may be expressed as a Fourier integral, because the fields $\vec E,\vec B$, and the resulting Lorentz force $\vec F_L$, are proportional to $\exp(i \omega t)$ (eigenmodes)

$V_\parallel(\beta) = \frac{1}{q} \vec e_s \cdot \int \vec F_L(s) \exp\left(i \frac{\omega}{\beta c} s\right)\,\mathrm d s = \frac{1}{q} \vec e_s \cdot \int \vec F_L(s) \exp\left(i k_\beta s\right)\,\mathrm d s$ with $k_\beta = \frac{\omega}{\beta c}$

Since the particles kinetic energy can only be changed by electric fields, this reduces to

$V_\parallel(\beta) = \int E_s(s) \exp\left(i k_\beta s\right)\,\mathrm d s$

=== Particle Phase considerations ===
Note that by the given definition, $V_\parallel$ is a complex quantity. This is advantageous, since the relative phase between particle and the experienced field was fixed in the previous considerations (the particle travelling through $s=0$ experienced maximum electric force).

To account for this degree of freedom, an additional phase factor $\phi$ is included in the eigenmode field definition

$E_s(s,t) = E_s(s) \; \exp\left(i \omega t + i \phi \right)$

which leads to a modified expression

$V_\parallel(\beta) = e^{i \phi} \int E_s(s) \exp\left(i k_\beta s\right)\,\mathrm d s$

for the voltage. In comparison to the former expression, only a phase factor with unit length occurs. Thus, the absolute value of the complex quantity $| V_\parallel(\beta) |$ is independent of the particle-to-eigenmode phase $\phi$. It represents the maximum achievable voltage that is experienced by a particle with optimal phase to the applied field, and is the relevant physical quantity.

=== Transit time factor ===
A quantity named transit time factor

$T(\beta) = \frac{|V_\parallel|}{V_0}$

is often defined which relates the effective acceleration voltage $V_\parallel(\beta)$ to the time-independent acceleration voltage

$V_0 = \int E(s)\,\mathrm d s$.

In this notation, the effective acceleration voltage $|V_\parallel|$ is often expressed as $V_0 T$.

== Transverse voltage ==
In symbolic analogy to the longitudinal voltage, one can define effective voltages in two orthogonal directions $x,y$ that are transversal to the particle trajectory

$V_{x,y} = \frac{1}{q} \vec e_{x,y} \cdot \int \vec F_L(s) \exp\left(i k_\beta s\right)\,\mathrm d s$

which describe the integrated forces that deflect the particle from its design path. Since the modes that deflect particles may have arbitrary polarizations, the transverse effective voltage may be defined using polar notation by

$V_\perp^2(\beta) = V_x^2 + V_y^2, \quad \alpha = \arctan \frac{\tilde V_y}{\tilde V_x}$

with the polarization angle $\alpha$ The tilde-marked variables are not absolute values, as one might expect, but can have positive or negative sign, to enable a range $[-\pi/2,+\pi/2]$ for $\alpha$. For example, if $\tilde V_x = | V_x |$ is defined, then $\tilde V_y = V_y \cdot \exp(-i \arg V_x) \in \mathbb R$ must hold.

Note that this transverse voltage does not necessarily relate to a real change in the particles energy, since magnetic fields are also able to deflect particles. Also, this is an approximation for small-angle deflection of the particle, where the particles trajectory through the field can still be approximated by a straight line.
