= Code-switching (disambiguation) =

Code-switching is the use of more than one language in speech.

Code-switching or Code Switch may also refer to:

- Code Switch, a race and culture outlet and weekly podcast from National Public Radio in the United States
- Code switching (football), players who have converted from one football code to another
- Codepage switching, switching between two code pages in computer display systems
- Situational code-switching, the tendency in a speech community to use different languages or language varieties in different social situations

== See also ==
- Code (disambiguation)
- Code-mixing, the mixing of two or more languages or language varieties
- Macaronic language, text using a mixture of languages
- Switch (disambiguation)
- Switching (disambiguation)
