= Keystroke =

Keystroke may refer to:

- the action of typing on a computer or typewriter
- a switching for computer hardware engineers
- an event for software engineers and programmers
