= Modality =

Modality may refer to:

== Humanities ==
- Modality (theology), the organization and structure of the church, as distinct from sodality or parachurch organizations
- Modality (music), in music, the subject concerning certain diatonic scales
- Modalities (sociology), a concept in Anthony Giddens' structuration theory
- Modal logic (philosophy), a form of logic which distinguishes between (logically) "necessary truths" and "contingent truths"

== Linguistics ==
- Grammatical mood, expressive element of a verb
- Modality (semantics), the ways language can express various relationships to reality or truth
- Modality (semiotics), the channel by which signs are transmitted (oral, gesture, written)

== Medicine ==
- Modality (therapy), a method of therapeutic approach
- Modality (diagnosis), a method of diagnosis
- Modality (medical imaging), acquiring structural or functional images of the body
- Stimulus modality, a type of physical phenomenon or stimulus that one can sense, such as temperature and sound
- Modality Partnership, a British primary care provider

== Science and technology ==
- Transportation modality, a mode of transport
- Modality (human–computer interaction), a path of communication between the human and the computer, such as vision or touch
- Mode (user interface), a distinct setting within a computer program or any physical machine interface
- Stimulus modality, one aspect of a stimulus or what is perceived after a stimulus (e.g. light, sound, temperature, taste], pressure, or smell)

== Pseudoscience ==
- Modality (astrology)

== Other uses ==
- Multimedia learning
- In advance fee fraud (Nigerian 419 scams), the method of funds transfers; often used as a key-word in scam baiting
- Modal realism, the view that all possible worlds are as real as the actual world
- Extended modal realism, the view that all worlds, possible as well as impossible, are as real as the actual world
- Modalities (trade negotiations), the formulas, targets, or specific measures used to accomplish objectives in trade negotiations
- Modality (book), a 2009 book by the semanticist Paul Portner

== See also ==
- Mode (disambiguation)
- Modal (disambiguation)
