= Switch mode =

Switch mode, switched mode or switching mode may refer to:

- Switch-mode amplifier
- Switch-mode converter
- Switch-mode power supply
- Switch-mode regulator

== See also ==
- Mode switch (computing)
- Switch (disambiguation)
- Mode (disambiguation)
- Linear mode (disambiguation)
