= Switched =

Switched may refer to:

== Television ==
- Switched! (American TV series), a 2003–2004 reality series
- Switched! (Singaporean TV series), a 2007 drama series
- Switched (2018 TV series), a Japanese series
- "Switched" (Teen Titans), a 2003 episode

== Other uses ==
- Switched (band), an American nu metal band 1999–2010
- Switched (novel), a 2010 Trylle Tilogy novel by Amanda Hocking

== See also ==
- Switch (disambiguation)
