= Modal =

Modal may refer to:

- Modal (company)
- Modal (drug)
- Modal (textile)
- Modal window
- Modal verb
- Modal voice

== See also ==
- Mode (disambiguation)
- Modality (disambiguation)
