= Shunt impedance =

In accelerator physics, shunt impedance is a measure of the strength with which an eigenmode of a resonant radio frequency structure (e.g., in a microwave cavity) interacts with charged particles on a given straight line, typically along the axis of rotational symmetry. If not specified further, the term is likely to refer to longitudinal effective shunt impedance.

== Longitudinal shunt impedance ==
To produce longitudinal Coulomb forces which add up to the (longitudinal) acceleration voltage $\scriptstyle V_\parallel$, an eigenmode of the resonator has to be excited, leading to power dissipation $\scriptstyle P$. The definition of the longitudinal effective shunt impedance, $\scriptstyle R$, then reads:

$$R = \frac{|V_\parallel|^2}{P}$$

with the longitudinal effective acceleration voltage $\scriptstyle |V_\parallel|$.

The time-independent shunt impedance, $\scriptstyle R_0$, with the time-independent acceleration voltage $\scriptstyle V_0$ is defined:

$$R_0 = \frac{V_0^2}{P}.$$

One can use the quality factor $\scriptstyle Q$ to substitute $\scriptstyle P$ with an equivalent expression:

where W is the maximum energy stored. Since the quality factor is the only quantity in the right equation term that depends on wall properties, the quantity $\scriptstyle \frac{R}{Q}$ is often used to design cavities, omitting material properties at first (see also cavity geometry factor).

== Transverse shunt impedance ==
When a particle is deflected in transverse direction, the definition of the shunt impedance can be used with substitution of the (longitudinal) acceleration voltage by the transverse effective acceleration voltage, taking into account transversal Coulomb and Lorentz forces.

$$R_\perp = \frac{|V_\perp|^2}{P_0} = Q \frac{|V_\perp|^2}{\omega W}$$

This does not necessarily imply a change in particle energy since a particle can also be deflected by magnetic fields (see Panofsky-Wenzel theorem).

=== Polarization angle ===
Because the transverse deflection can be described with polar coordinates, one may define a deflection or polarization angle using the transverse acceleration voltage components. Polar coordinates are used because it is possible to add up voltage components like vectors, but not shunt impedances.
