= Jeff Green (multimedia artist) =

Canadian author, playwright, producer and director

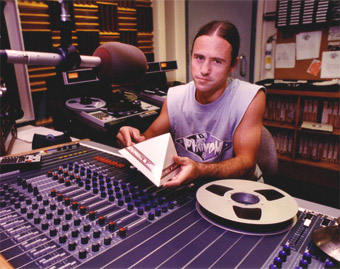
- Jeff Green at a radio production console
- Born: June 21, 1956 (age 70); Halifax, Nova Scotia, Canada
- Occupation: Multimedia artist
- Writing career
- Genres: Speculative fiction, dystopian fiction, metaphysics, radio drama, children's television
- Website: www.strangermedia.com

Jeffrey Stuart Green (born June 21, 1956) is a Canadian author, playwright, producer, and director, who has worked in a variety of media including radio, television, computer, DVD-based multimedia, and in live nightclub settings. His work has earned him critical acclaim and a number of awards. In addition to the work he has created, he was instrumental in the evolution of broadcast radio in the Ottawa market during the late 1970s and the 1980s — specifically, the Carleton University non-profit radio station CKCU-FM and the commercial album-oriented rock radio station CHEZ-FM.

== Career ==
Jeff Green began his career in radio in 1972 at Carleton University's CKCU-FM, when it was only running with a carrier current license — "broadcasting" by closed circuit to the university commons areas, and through a transmitter in the residence building to the students there. He was one of the founding Production Managers when CKCU received its FM radio license in 1975. In 1976, he became the founding Production Manager at the Ottawa album-oriented rock station CHEZ-FM. In 1980, he received a Canada Council Explorations grant to create the radio drama Epiphanies, intended as a pilot for a series that was never produced. In addition to his work in radio, he was editor for the now-defunct tabloid entertainment paper Ottawa Revue from 1981 to 1983. From 1983 to 1985, he was Central and Eastern Canada's first VJ, presenting groundbreaking video programming at Ottawa rock and roll venue Barrymore's before music video television was generally available in Canada (MTV had just launched and was only available by satellite television, which was relatively rare at the time). In Ottawa, from 1979 through 1983, Jeff Green designed and executed an annual series of popular live club multimedia performances at Hallowe'en entitled "Ne'ewollah".

In 1985, he began the series of radio dramas that became known as Soundings. Soundings went on to win several awards, including a silver medal at the New York International Radio Festival. Originally aired on Ottawa's CHEZ-FM, episodes of the series were eventually broadcast on the Canadian Broadcasting Corporation, Australian Broadcasting Corporation, and National Public Radio (U.S.) networks, as well as London's LBC Radio station. The radio plays were featured on XM Satellite Radio's former Sonic Theater channel.

In 1990, Green began an association with members of Ottawa's Salt & Pepper Theatre Company which resulted in the four-season Cowboy Who? television series, an all-ages satire of children's programming for which he was co-creator, co-writer, producer, director, engineer, and performer. The series was broadcast from 1991 to 1995 on Mid-Canada Television, and won the 1992 Canpro Award (Canadian Independent Television Producer's Association) for Best Children's Series.

In 1993, he teamed up with the Animatics Multimedia Corporation, which resulted in the award-winning video-based interactive multimedia productions Midnight Stranger and Mode on which he acted as co-creator, writer, and director. These dramas were notable for their innovative user interface and "point of view" social interaction.

== Works ==
=== Radio ===
==== Early radio plays ====
- Azort Starbolt: Space Android (1973, various lengths) — early 1970s, inspired by Monty Python and The Firesign Theatre
- August Awareness (1977, 60 min.) — audio tapestry and spoken word science fiction
- For A Breath I Tarry (1977, 30 min.) — an adaptation of the Roger Zelazny story

==== The Soundings series of radio plays ====
- "Epiphanies" (1980, 60 min.) — a disillusioned politician faces an opponent with an uncanny power over sound
- "Spaxter" (1986, 45 min.) — a sardonic near-future thriller that pits a techno-telepathic private investigator against a self-styled digital deity
- "The Tuning" (1986, 45 min.) — a portrait of a future media indistinguishable from reality, and the change to reality it helps bring about
- "Flash!" (1986, 45 min.) — three people flee holocaust in the wilds of Northern Ontario only to discover that fate has something different in store for them
- "Somebody Talking to You" (1986, 45 min.) — a present-day alt-culture dilettante witnesses the takeover of the world, one Walkman at time
- "She Dreams of Atlantis" (1987, 45 min.) — an ad executive has visions of a past life that she just might still be living
- "Spaxterback" (1987, 45 min.) — a near-omniscient future computer sets Spaxter on the track of an alien manifestation
- "Xmas Is Coming to the District of Drudge" (1988, 45 min.) — a government worker in a dystopian world devoid of passion encounters a strange substance
- "Vigilante" (1988, 30 min.) — a wish-fulfillment fantasy, and an examination of the nature and morality of vigilantism
- "Psychotherapy" (1988, 30 min.) — an homage to Edgar Allan Poe, set in a chilling madhouse
- "Plague" (1989, 30 min.) — a nightmare future where the world's surviving populations languish under vast domes that hold a plague at bay

==== Progressive rock documentaries ====
Written and produced by Jeff Green (he produced numerous others):

- Gabriel (1978, 30 min.) — built around an interview with Peter Gabriel on the occasion of the tour for his second album
- The Answer Is Yes (1987, 60 min.) — an exhaustive analysis of the prog rock band Yes, tracing their story from the beginning to the album "Union"
- Jon Anderson (1987, 60min.) — built around an interview with Jon Anderson, recorded backstage at an Anderson, Bruford, Wakeman, and Howe concert, explores his music, mind, and motivations
- Pink Floyd: You Gotta Be Crazy (1987, 60 min.) — a profile of Pink Floyd produced on the occasion of the first non-Waters tour supporting their "A Momentary Lapse of Reason" album
- David Gilmour (1987, 75 min.) — (unedited) interview with David Gilmour at the start of Pink Floyd's first non-Waters tour, widely distributed amongst European Pink Floyd fan network
- Whatever Happened To Alice? (1987, 58 min.) — a profile of shock rocker Alice Cooper built around an interview on the eve of their 1987 tour

==== Additional radio shows ====
- The Salt & Pepper Radio Show (1987, 8 episodes, 30 min. each) — produced and directed children's radio series
- The War Of The Worlds Special (1988, 60 min.) — part audio essay, part remix of other productions
- Bomb (2003, 10 min.) — written and produced, and recorded using binaural technology for a CBC experimental radio program

=== Television ===
- Ki-Ai! (1984) wrote, produced, and directed series about aikido for Ottawa's Skyline Cablevision
- Cowboy Who? (1991–1995, 45 episodes over 4 seasons, 30 min. each) — co-creator, co-writer, producer, director, and performer

=== Multimedia ===
- Ne'ewollah (1979 – 1983, various locations) — annual live club multimedia "Hallowe'en" performance
- Midnight Stranger (1994, Animatics Multimedia Corporation) — writer and director of award-winning video-based multimedia CD-ROM production. Experienced from the player's point of view, they play a stranger in a late-night city who engages random people in conversation on the street, in bars, clubs, or restaurants
- Mode (1995, Animatics Multimedia Corporation in collaboration with Corel Corporation) — writer and director of video-based multimedia CD-ROM production. Experienced from the player's point of view, they crash a high-society party only to discover that something supernatural is occurring

== Awards ==
- 1984 — Technical Award (Canadian Cable Television Association) for Ki-Ai! (innovative intro graphics)
- 1988 — Best Radio Program of the Year, Ottawa (ACTRA) for "Xmas Is Coming To The District Of Drudge"
- 1989 — Best Radio Program of the Year, Ottawa (ACTRA) for "Plague"
- 1990 — Silver Medal (New York International Radio Festival) for the Soundings series as aired on NPR under the title The Weird Worlds of Jeff Green
- 1992 — Canpro Award for Best Children’s Series (Canadian Independent Television Producer's Association) for Cowboy Who?
- 1993 — People's Choice Award (Macromedia) for Midnight Stranger
- 1995 — Murphy Award for Best Story in an Interactive Multimedia Title (Electronic Entertainment) for Midnight Stranger
- Inductee, ASFSFA Hall of Fame for "Spaxter" (American Society for Science Fiction Audio)
  Awarded a Mark Time Award for Best in Science Fiction Radio and Audio in the History of Recorded Sound
