= Cryomodule =

Acceleration cavity module in modern particle accelerators

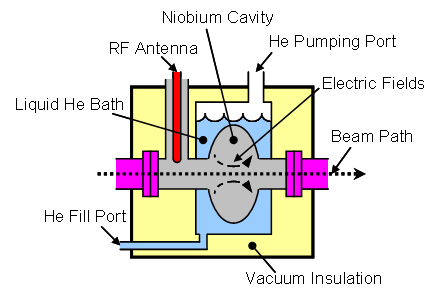
Simplified sketch of a SRF cavity in a helium bath, with RF coupling and a passing particle beam.

A cryomodule is a section of a modern particle accelerator composed of superconducting RF (SRF) acceleration cavities, which need very low operating temperatures (often around 2 Kelvin). The cryomodule is a complex, state-of-the-art supercooled component in which particle beams are accelerated for scientific research. The superconducting cavities are cooled with liquid helium.

A cryomodule section of an accelerator is composed of superconducting cavities that accelerate the beam, also including a magnetic lattice that provides focusing and steering.

== Design considerations ==
SRF cavities tend to be thin-walled structures immersed in a bath of liquid helium having temperatures of 1.6 K to 4.5 K. Careful engineering is required to insulate the helium bath from the room-temperature external environment. This is accomplished by:

- A vacuum chamber surrounding the cold components to eliminate convective heat transfer by gases.
- Multi-layer insulation wrapped around cold components. This insulation is composed of dozens of alternating layers of aluminized mylar and thin fiberglass sheet, which reflects infrared radiation that shines through the vacuum insulation from the 300 K exterior walls.
- Low thermal conductivity mechanical connections between the cold mass and the room temperature vacuum vessel. These connections are required, for example, to support the mass of the helium vessel inside the vacuum vessel and to connect the apertures in the SRF cavity to the accelerator beamline. Both types of connections transition from internal cryogenic temperatures to room temperature at the vacuum vessel boundary. The thermal conductivity of these parts is minimized by having small cross sectional area and being composed of low thermal conductivity material, such as stainless steel for the vacuum beampipe and fiber reinforced epoxies (G10) for mechanical support. The vacuum beampipe also requires good electrical conductivity on its interior surface to propagate the image currents of the beam, which is accomplished by about 100 μm of copper plating on the interior surface.
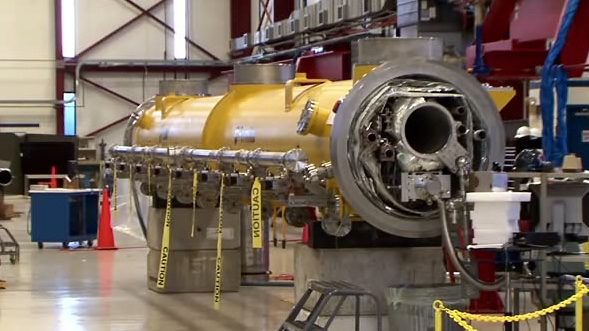
A cryomodule of International Linear Collider being tested at Fermilab

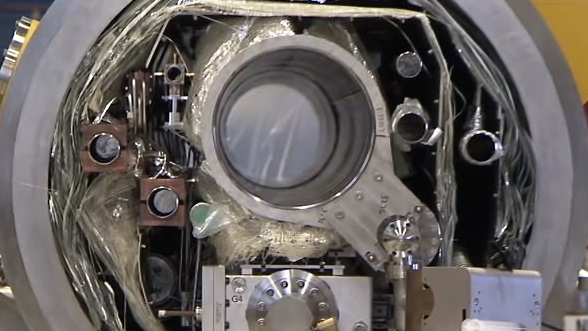
Cross section of the cryomodule. A large tube at the center is Helium gas return pipe. The closed tube below it is the beam axis.

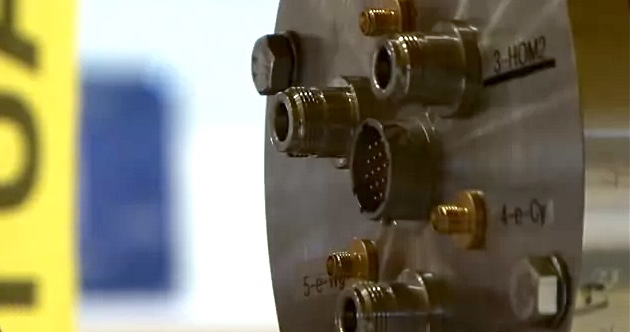
A flange of the cryomodule is used to connect instrumentation wires and cables.

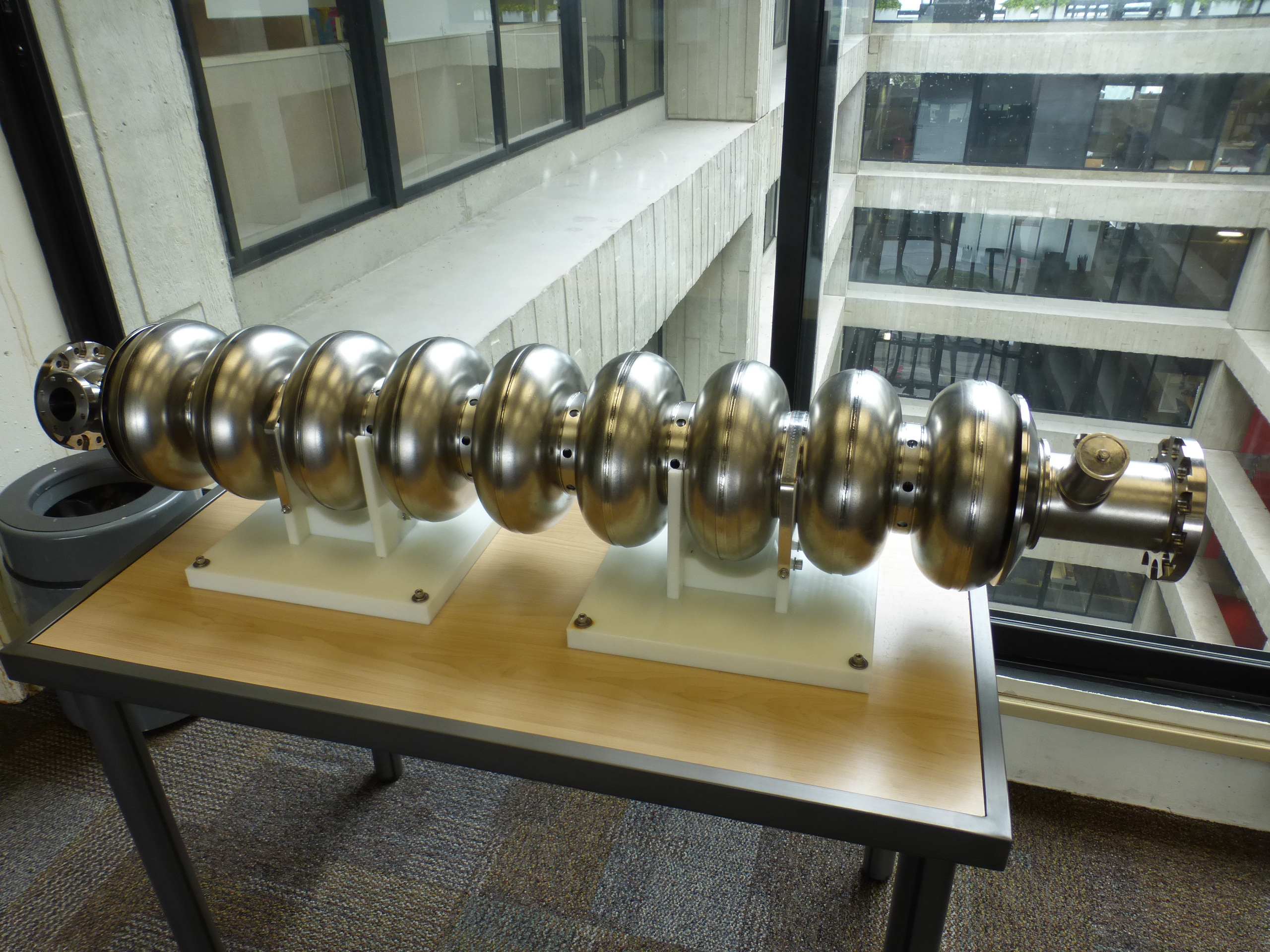
An example of niobium-based 1.3 GHz nine-cell superconducting radio frequency to be put along the beam axis inside the cryomodule
