= Soundings (radio drama) =

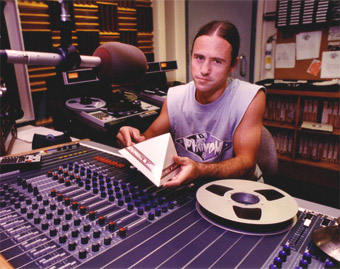
Writer/Producer/Engineer Jeff Green

Soundings is a radio drama series produced from 1985 to 1989 in Ottawa by multimedia artist Jeff Green. Episodes were generally in the science fiction genre.

== Overview ==
All the plays in the series were written, produced, directed and engineered by Green, with the exception of “Epiphanies” which was engineered by Charles Fairfield. All of the music in the series was composed and engineered by Fairfield, with the exception of songs in "Flash" and "She Dreams of Atlantis".

Seven of the eleven plays in the series are 45 minutes in length, which Green chose to allow listeners to record episodes with the prevalent cassette home recording technology of the time. The original pilot for the series, "Epiphanies", is the only one that is an hour in length. The remaining three plays "Psychotherapy", "Vigilante" and "Plague" are each 30 minutes in length, and were first broadcast as a mini-series of horror tales on CHEZ-FM called Weird Words.

Some distributed versions of “Soundings” also include a ten-minute play called “Bomb” that is not technically part of the series, but was recorded using binaural technology for a Canadian Broadcasting Corporation experimental radio program.

== History ==
Green's first radio drama work was done while a volunteer at Carleton University's campus radio station CKCU-FM while it was still an AM carrier current and closed circuit station. In 1980 he applied for and received a Canada Council Explorations grant to produce a pilot for a series of radio drama works called “Epiphanies”. In 1982 he presented the pilot to Ottawa album-oriented rock station CHEZ-FM and they agreed to air a series of plays.

In 1989 the Canadian Broadcasting Corporation aired several of the plays as part of their “Vanishing Point” drama series. In 1990 America's National Public Radio aired the series. Also in 1990, the play “Somebody Talking To You” was aired on London, England's LBC station, and referenced in Tim Crook's book “Radio Drama – Theory and Practice”. In 1991, several plays were aired on Australia Broadcasting Corporation's national network. Green's work is occasionally broadcast and streamed in the U.S. as part of the prominent audio theatre program, "Sound Affects: A Radio Playground," which is featured on KFAI as part of their "spoken word groove." The radio plays were featured on XM Satellite Radio's former Sonic Theater channel.

== Awards ==
- 1988 — Best Radio Program of the Year, Ottawa (ACTRA) for "Xmas Is Coming To The District Of Drudge"
- 1989 — Best Radio Program of the Year, Ottawa (ACTRA) for "Plague"
- 1990 — Silver Medal (New York International Radio Festival) for the series as aired on NPR under the title "The Weird Worlds of Jeff Green"
- Inductee, ASFSFA Hall of Fame for "Spaxter" (American Society for Science Fiction Audio)
  Awarded a Mark Time Award for Best in Science Fiction Radio and Audio in the History of Recorded Sound

== The plays ==
=== Spaxter (1986) ===
Spaxter is a cyberpunk comedy that stars Green as the title character, a sci-fi Raymond Chandler gumshoe fitted with a hi-tech head implant (“the meld”) conveying telepathic capabilities, who goes up against a super-villain who has styled himself as an Egyptian god, has purchased and refitted the Great Pyramid at Giza, and is using adapted meld technology to steal the creative essence from the world's great minds in order to fuel his ascendance to true deity status.

Cast

- Jeff_Green: Spaxter
- John Koensgen: Graft
- Shelley Hartman: Louella
- Rick Jones: Osiris
- Catherine Anka: Mae Westar
- John Tarswell: Newsbyte
- Robert Bockstael: Ahkenaton

Running Length: 45 minutes

=== Spaxterback (1987) ===
Spaxterback, the sequel to Spaxter, has a globe-spanning mega-computer named MARS create Spaxter as a cloned agent based on his fictional personality in order to have him help determine why the world is undergoing an explosion of UFO activity. It turns out that a rogue group of aliens has been selling breeding rights for humankind to other species, and when Spaxter tricks them into calling in their “Overlord” this mysterious entity solves the problem by invoking a program called “Everything’s True”. The "protocol" includes a massive concert starring “The Callers” where a crowd of neo-hippies attempt to contact the aliens.

Cast

- Jeff Green: Spaxter
- John Koensgen: Mars
- Shelley Hartman: Louella
- Mike Giunta: Borado Nikto
- Mike O’Reilly: The Aliens

Running Length: 45 minutes

=== Flash (1986) ===
Flash is a drama set in Algonquin Park in Ontario where three individuals flee in canoes in an attempt to avoid a global nuclear war. While they are on the lakes they experience mysterious flashes that seem to trigger individual supernatural events that may link them to past or future lives. In the end they determine that the force of their wills can cause them to save special individuals who have been vaporized by nuclear blasts and so begin rebuilding society.

Cast

- John Koensgen: Indy
- Shelley Irvine: Tara
- Terence Scammell: Ray
- Shelley Hartmen: the girl from Berlin
- Featuring original music by Ian Tamblyn with Lynn Miles

Running Length: 45 minutes

=== She Dreams of Atlantis (1987) ===
She Dreams of Atlantis tells the story of Victoria Doubleday, a successful ad executive who just landed the lucrative Metacorps contract promoting their latest achievement—an array of power satellites in geosynchronous orbit that will solve all mankind's energy needs. But Victoria has dreams where she is a queen in ancient Atlantis who is being asked to decide on a power project by the mages. She becomes convinced that Atlantis was destroyed by her past-life decision to allow the mage project, that the Metacorps project will similarly destroy civilization, and that through her dreams she can go into the past and solve both problems at once.

Cast

- Shelley Irvine: Victoria Doubleday, Elna
- Gerard Lepage: Max, Kyros
- Jim Bradford: Axworthy, Mage Manalon
- Jackson Baker: Proteus
- Featuring members of the St.Matthew's Boy's Choir directed by Richard Dacey

Running Length: 45 minutes

=== Somebody Talking To You (1986) ===
Somebody Talking To You pits a multi-talented media consultant against an inexplicable invasion of his world by some kind of addictive cassettes, marked with only the simple phrase “Somebody Talking To You”. Everyone except him apparently hears something perfectly personally compelling, and eventually they disappear completely. When their cassette is then played their voice can be heard, “talking to you”. In the end he is the only one left, uncertain as to what has occurred.

Cast

- Geoff Gruson: Hal Mercury
- Beverly Wolfe: Selena Silence
- Dan Lalonde: Doctor Sid
- Ayden Suatac: John Revel

Running Length: 45 minutes

=== Xmas Is Coming To The District of Drudge (1988) ===
Xmas Is Coming To The District of Drudge is an unusual Christmas story set in the dystopian world of Drudge where anything remotely exciting or interesting is forbidden. One man comes across a strange substance called “Christmas” that appears to be just a piece of fruitcake but when eaten causes him to briefly experience a parallel world filled with Yuletide cheer. He has it analyzed and discovers it has an element that somehow “activates” its component water. He hatches a plan to first administer it to his brutal boss (who experiences it as a Dickensian visit with his past, present and future), and then transform the entire world.

Cast

- Rob Welch: Joe Carpenter
- Geoff Gruson: Herodius Bruse
- Heather Esdon: Marie
- Alan Templeton: Matthew
- Bill Lee: The Announcer

Running Length: 45 minutes

=== The Tuning (1986) ===
The Tuning is a science fantasy based in a bizarre future where the primary entertainment is a full-immersion interactive experiential media called “tuning”. Artemus Tamerlane is a talented tuner who discovers that there are powerful forces behind the scenes and that if he can defeat them he is destined to lead his society into a transcendental age.

Cast

- Terence Scammell: Artemus Tamerlane
- Les Lye: The Prime Players
- Bridget Robinson: Wanda Betty June
- Robert Bockstael: Captain Video

Running Length: 45 minutes

=== Epiphanies (1980) ===
Epiphanies tells the story of Joshua Bellows, a small-time politician who happens into a small town to discover it in the grip of an AM deejay who apparently has the power to manipulate sound. The more he investigates the more convinced he is that a supernatural force has manifested itself, and he decides his destiny is to confront it. In an encounter at a local bar he engages in a psychic battle with the force and defeats it, or is himself defeated.

Cast

- Jim Bradford: Joshua Bellows
- Gary Paige: Sonny, The Auditor
- Anna MacCormack: Anna Chambers
- Bernie McManus: Bobby Stocks
- John Nolan: Professor Malleus
- Shelley Hartman: June Oasis
- Bruce Feather: The Narrator

Running Length: 60 minutes

=== Vigilante (1988) ===
Vigilante is about an autistic savant who is obsessed with one particular newscaster on a local TV station, and discovers that he has the power to go to the site of ongoing crimes and telekinetically affect events, causing the criminals to end their lives in ways appropriate to their evils. In time this vigilante spree spreads to any malfeasance mentioned on the newscast, and the newscaster comes to realize that he is the nexus of the supernatural activity. By naming the vigilante as the number one criminal on his newscast he ends both their careers.

Cast

- Rob Eastland: Ward
- Ray Stone: James Gospel
- Nancy Clark: The Mother
- Shelley Aaron: Vicki
- Barry Blake: The Barber
- Chuck Collins: Peter Witness

Running Length: 30 minutes

=== Psychotherapy (1988) ===
Psychotherapy is an homage to Edgar Allan Poe. Mark Allen is a troubled man who on the advice of his psychiatrist decides to undertake a radical new therapy offered at a remote sanatorium, but when he gets there discovers that the inmates have taken over the facility, obsessed with recreating the horrors in the work of Poe. To escape he must convince them he is sympathetic to their cause, and in the end finds the experience has affected his own cure.

Cast

- Dave Hudson: Mark Allen
- Chuck Collins: Dr. Pilar, Officer Fin
- Neil Kelly: Dr.Shock
- Mitzi Hauser: The Receptionist

Running Length: 30 minutes

=== Plague (1989) ===
Plague is a grim depiction of a future time when the world has succumbed to a global plague that has forced the remnants of humanity into vast sealed domes, but even this precaution is proving only a delay to their ultimate doom. Mannie is a dome officer who suffers repeated personal calamities but is obsessed with rumours of certain individuals who have through an experimental process become immune to the plague, and in particular a Woman In White who has been seen walking contaminated streets unprotected. In the end he finds the woman has been looking for him, and he is himself one of the immune.

Cast

- Robert Bockstael: Mannie
- Mary Ellis: Lotta
- Tim O’Ray: Peter Semblen
- Chris Shoemaker: Abel
- Shelley Aaron: The Voice of Dome Control

Running Length: 30 minutes

=== Bomb (2003) ===
In a dark future where an aggressive America has annexed parts of Canada. Northern terrorists are using something called the SEMP, a nanotechnology pill that causes an individual's atoms to align to turn their body into a short range electromagnetic pulse bomb (killing them in the process), attacking the American occupiers by wiping out key computer and control systems. Zyla Jova is a Canadian government functionary who witnesses a retaliatory American urban attack then is called upon to oversee the matter transportation of the Prime Minister to a U.S. location where she is expected to capitulate to further imposed restrictions. But there is a rumour of a "MegaSEMP", a pill that can trigger an exponential chain reaction in any other individuals nearby, potentially killing millions. Just before she is sent, did the PM swallow something?

Cast

- Christopher Handfield: Maylon
- Leslie Crate: Zyla Jova
- Alan Neil: Bran Parlan
- Lorraine Ansell: Lucinda Tantelus
- Music: Little Joker

Running Length: 10 minutes
