= Scott W. Tinker =

American geologist (born 1959)

Scott W. Tinker (born November 15, 1959) is an American geologist, energy researcher, educator, documentary filmmaker and public TV host. He served as the director of the Bureau of Economic Geology at the University of Texas at Austin from 2000 to 2024 and concurrently as the State Geologist of Texas.^{[1]} He held the Edwin Allday Endowed Chair of Subsurface Geology in the Jackson School of Geosciences. Since 2024, he holds the titles of Director Emeritus of the Bureau of Economic Geology and Professor and Allday Endowed Chair Emeritus in the Jackson School of Geosciences at UT Austin.

Tinker is the founder and chairman of the Switch Energy Alliance, a 501(c)(3) nonprofit organization focused on energy education through film and media. He co-produced and served as the on-screen guide for the documentary Switch (2012) on global energy, and executive produced and guided its sequel Switch On (2020) on global energy poverty. He is the executive producer and host of Energy Switch, a PBS talk show on energy and climate that debuted in 2022 and now airs in over 85% of PBS stations nationwide, and the host of EarthDate, a weekly public radio program airing on more than 470 stations across all 50 U.S. states.

== Early life and education ==
Tinker was born in Centralia, Illinois, in 1959. His mother was Janice Wheeler Tinker and his father, C. N. "Tom" Tinker, was a geologist. In 1982, he completed a Bachelor of Science in Geology and Business Administration, Magna Cum Laude and Phi Beta Kappa at the Trinity University in San Antonio, Texas. He also received a Master of Science in Geological Sciences from the University of Michigan, Ann Arbor in 1985, and a Ph.D. in Geological Sciences from the University of Colorado, Boulder in 1996.

== Career ==
Tinker's career in the oil and gas industry includes Robert M. Sneider Exploration in Houston, Texas (1982–83), Union Pacific Resources in Englewood, Colorado (1985–1988) and Marathon Oil's Petroleum Technology Center (1988–1999). He became the director of the Bureau of Economic Geology in 2000 at the University of Texas at Austin (2000–present). Tinker has served as the state geologist of Texas (2000–present) and he is now a professor, holding the Edwin Allday Endowed Chair of Subsurface Geology in the Jackson School of Geosciences at the University of Texas at Austin (2002–present).

Tinker is the founder and Chairman of the non-partisan Switch Energy Alliance, a 501(c)(3), whose vision is to inspire an energy-educated future through films. He is the co-producer and on-screen guide for the feature-length documentary, Switch, the critically acclaimed film released in 2012 on global energy. He is also the writer and the on-screen guide for Switch On, released in 2019, about global energy poverty.

Tinker has visited over 65 countries and delivered over 850 invited and keynote lectures to audiences globally.

== Media ==
Tinker has been interviewed and quoted by publications such as The New York Times, The Wall Street Journal, NPR, Forbes, The Hill, Nature, Scientific American, Bloomberg, USA Today, The Dallas Morning News, and Houston Chronicle. Select interviews include:

- The Dallas Morning News, February 9, 2020, by Scott Tinker, The 'zero-emissions' promise relies on magic math: The U.S. will meet Paris climate targets on time without a Clean Power Plan.
- RealClear Energy, May 15, 2020, by Robert Bryce, New Film 'SwitchOn' Spotlights Transformative Power of Energy.
- Scientific American, August 16, 2019, by Scott Tinker, Carbon Pricing Is Not a Fix for Climate Change / The problem: developing countries can't afford to go along.
- The Hill, April 12, 2019, by Scott Tinker, Climate and energy solutions require setting politics aside.
- The Hill, June 25, 2018, by Scott W. Tinker, Even 'clean' and 'green' energy have an environmental impact.
- Bloomberg, October 23, 2017 [interview], by David Wethe, Rise in Earthquakes Near Texas Oilfields Prompts New Monitoring.
- Forbes, August 10, 2017, by Scott Tinker, Why 'Keep It In The Ground' Is Not Necessarily Green.
- Forbes Opinion, January 19, 2017 [Guest Post], by Scott W. Tinker, We Need Secure Energy For America.
- The Dallas Morning News, September 30, 2016, by Scott W. Tinker, EPA's Clean Power Plan is not so clean.
- Houston Chronicle, July 21, 2016, by Scott W. Tinker, Tinker: In oil and gas regulations, one size doesn't fit all.
- The Dallas Morning News, May 23, 2016, by Scott W. Tinker, On the politics of earthquakes and fracking, we need a radical middle.
- USA Today, January 21, 2016 [interview], by Rick Jervis, Crashing oil prices hit former Texas boomtowns.
- The New York Times, January 15, 2016, by Clifford Krauss, Stock Prices Sink in the Rising Ocean of Oil
- USA Today, January 11, 2016 [interview], by Donnelle Eller, Climate concerns ignite search for next-gen energy.
- Nature.com, December 3, 2014, by Mason Inman, The Fracking Fallacy
- StateImpact Texas, NPR, July 19, 2012, by Terrence Henry, A View From the Tipping Point: The "Switch" for Energy's Future
- The Wall Street Journal, June 24, 2014, by Alison Sider and Nicole Friedman, Oil From U.S. Fracking Is More Volatile Than Expected
- NPR, February 28, 2013, by Wade Goodwyn, Texas Study Points to a Longer Natural Gas Boom
- The Wall Street Journal, February 27, 2013, by Russell Gold, Gas Boom Projected to Grow for Decades
- The New York Times, September 20, 2012, Energy by the Numbers: 'Switch' Explores a World of Fuel Options
- The New York Times, August 2, 2010, by William J. Broad, Tracing Oil Reserves to Their Tiny Origins
- Scott W. Tinker on ex nihilo, a video conversation (2024)

== Switch ==
The documentary film Switch (2012), subtitled in four languages, attempts a non-partisan, scientifically-based exploration of the global energy transition, the future of global energy production, and global energy demand. Switch won the "Best of Fest" prize at the Colorado Environmental Film Festival and it was selected as the opening night film of the D.C. Environmental Film Festival in Washington As of January 2016, the film has been screened at over 600 universities and it has been seen by millions of people globally.

The film is part of the Switch Energy Project, an energy education, and efficiency venture.

== Honors and awards ==
Tinker was elected a Fellow of the Geological Society of America (GSA) in 2011, and he is an Honorary Member of the American Association of Petroleum Geologists (AAPG). He is the youngest recipient of the AAPG's Halbouty Distinguished Leadership Award (2016). Tinker has been nominated president of the American Geosciences Institute (2015–2016), AAPG (2008–2009), Association of American State Geologists (2007–2008), and Gulf Coast Association of Geological Societies (2011–2012). Tinker has served as a Distinguished Lecturer for AAPG (1997–1998), the Society of Petroleum Engineers (SPE) (2002), and GSA (Michael T. Halbouty Distinguished Lecturer, 2012). Tinker received the J. C. "Cam" Sproule Memorial Award for Best Paper published in AAPG Bulletin by an author 35 years or younger (1996) and the best paper published in the Journal of Sedimentary Research (1998).

== Selected bibliography ==
Ikonnikova S., Browning J., Gulen G., and Tinker, S.W., 2015, Factors influencing shale gas production forecasting: Empirical studies of Barnett, Fayetteville, Haynesville, and Marcellus Shale plays. Economics of Energy & Environmental Policy, V. 4, Issue 1, pp. 19–35.

Gülen, G., Ikonnikova, S., Browning, J., Smye, K., and Tinker, S.W., 2015, Production Scenarios for the Haynesville Shale Play, SPE Economics and Management, V. 7, Issue 4, pp. 138–147.

Ikonnikova, S., Gülen, G., Browning, J., and S. Tinker, 2015, Profitability of Shale Gas Drilling: A Case Study of the Fayetteville Shale Play, Energy, V. 81, 1 March 2015, pp. 382–393. doi:10.1016/j.energy.2014.12.051.

Fu, Q., Horvath, S. C., Potter, E. C., Roberts, F., Tinker, S. W., Ikonnikova, S., Fisher, W. L., and Yan, J., 2014, Log-derived thickness and porosity of the Barnett Shale, Fort Worth Basin, Texas: Implications for assessment of gas shale resource, AAPG Bulletin, V. 99, No. 1, pp. 119–141.

Ikonnikova, S., Browning, J., Horvath, S., Tinker, S.W., 2014, Well Recovery, Drainage Area, and Future Drill-well Inventory: Empirical Study of the Barnett Shale Gas Play. SPE Reservoir Evaluation & Engineering, V. 17, Issue 04, pp. 484–496.

Gülen, G., Browning J., Ikonnikova, S., Tinker, S.W., 2013, Well economics across ten tiers in low and high BTU (British thermal unit) areas, Barnett Shale, Texas. Energy, October 2013, V. 60, No. 10, pp. 302–315.

Browning, J., Ikonnikova, S., Gülen, G., Tinker, S.W., 2013, Barnett Shale Production Outlook. SPE Economics & Management (165585), July 2013, pp. 89–104.

Tinker, S.W., Lynch, H., Carpenter, M., and Hoover, M., 2013, Global energy and the role of geosciences: A North American perspective, in Bickford, ME, ed., The Impact of the Geological Sciences on Society. Geological Society of America Special Paper 501, pp. 21–51.

Tinker, S.W., and Potter, E.C., 2009, The unconventional bridge to an alternate energy future, in Carr, T., D'agostino, T., Ambrose, W., Pashin, J., and Rosen, N.C., eds. Unconventional energy resources: making the unconventional conventional. 29th Annual GCSSEPM Foundation Bob F. Perkins Research Conference, December 6–8, Houston, pp. 1–5.

Tinker, S.W., 2006, Making enhanced recovery feasible in natural gas fields. The American Oil & Gas Reporter, V. 49, No. 5, pp. 58–64.

Tinker, S.W., 2006, The "I" in busIness ethIcs: American Institute of Professional Geologists. The Professional Geologist, V. 43, No. 2, pp. 36–42.

Tinker, S.W., 2004, Unconventional resources to play vital supply role as world transitions to gas. The American Oil and Gas Reporter, V. 47, No. 10, pp. 63–71.

Tinker, S.W., Caldwell, D.H., Cox, D.M., Zahm, L.C., Brinton, Lisë, 2004, Integrated reservoir characterization of a carbonate ramp reservoir, South Dagger Draw field, New Mexico: seismic data are only part of the story, in Seismic imaging of carbonate reservoirs and systems. American Association of Petroleum Geologists Memoir 81, pp. 91–105.

Tinker, S.W., 1998, Shelf-to-basin facies distribution and sequence stratigraphy of a steep-rimmed carbonate margin: Capitan depositional system, McKittrick Canyon, New Mexico and Texas. Journal of Sedimentary Research, V. 68, No. 6, pp. 1146–1174.

Kerans, C., and Tinker S.W., 1997, Sequence stratigraphy and characterization of carbonate reservoirs. Society of Economic Paleontologists and Mineralogists Short Course No. 40, p. 130.

Tinker, S.W., 1996, Building the 3-D jigsaw puzzle: applications of sequence stratigraphy to 3-D reservoir characterization, Permian Basin. AAPG Bulletin, V. 80, No. 4, pp. 460–485.
