= DJ Switch =

DJ Switch may refer to:

- Switch (music producer) (Dave Taylor, born 1977), a house DJ from the United Kingdom
- Mr Switch (Anthony Culverwell), a turntablist DMC champion hip-hop DJ from the United Kingdom, formerly known as DJ Switch
- DJ Switch (Ghanaian DJ) (Erica Armah Bra-Bulu Tandoh, born 2007)
- DJ Switch (Nigerian DJ) (Obianuju Catherine Udeh)
