= Switch (app) =

Job-matching app

- Release: June 2014
- Operating system: iOS
- Type: Job search engine
- Website: switchapp.com

Switch was a mobile-only job-matching app that connected candidates directly to hiring managers. Candidates could upload their resumes and connect their social and professional media profiles, but remain anonymous while searching. Users received a daily set of job recommendations that fit their backgrounds and salary criteria, and swipe right to apply. Employers post many jobs on Switch directly, which eliminates the need for third-party job boards and recruiters, and connects job seekers to hiring managers. Switch reveals a candidate’s identity to one employer at a time, only after the candidate matches with that employer. When candidates and employers match, they can chat within the app. Switch is available for iOS, with an Android version in development.

== History ==
=== Founding ===
Yarden Tadmor founded Switch in New York City in January 2014. For the first 10 months, Tadmor funded the company himself. By December 2014, Switch had raised $1.4 million in funding from venture capitals firms Metamorphic Ventures, SG VC, BAM and Rhodium. Tadmor's inspiration for Switch came after being frustrated by his experience both as a job seeker, and also as a supervisor hiring at numerous technology startup companies.

Tadmor has said of Switch, “We operate on the five-second resume principle, which is usually the amount of time a recruiter spends on a resume. They scan through the typical data points and move on.”

Switch was designed for passive job seekers to browse openings discreetly and connect quickly. Originally, Switch served only the New York metro area technology sector while in early beta, but Tadmor always intended to expand into national coverage. Soon, the company started including all major metropolitan markets across the U.S. In May 2015, Switch announced it would start sourcing tech and media jobs from all the job boards available online. Later in 2015, Switch began to post jobs in smaller urban areas. The company also expanded industries and jobs to include restaurant staff, retail sales, healthcare, nursing and education.

Tadmor subsequently founded Livekick, a one-on-one private fitness and yoga instruction company, based in New York.

== Operation ==
In May 2015, Switch reported generating over 400,000 job applications. The company said that nine of the 50 largest websites in the U.S. were using the service. It had grown its customer base to thousands of companies in a few months from launch including Microsoft, Amazon, Facebook, IBM, Yahoo!, eBay, DropBox, SoundCloud, and Wikipedia. John Cline, software development manager at eBay, told ABC’s Good Morning America that Switch is now his “main way of finding new prospective employees.”

Switch uses a double opt-in technique, meaning job seekers and employers must both say yes before moving forward. They also use swiping technology and intelligent matching algorithms to connect job seekers and employers. The user experience is different for each group, but the major attraction for both sides is the speed at which they can be connected.

=== Features ===
- Swipe is a major aspect of the Switch user experience. Job seekers swipe to apply to jobs, or left to pass on positions. Employers respond and swipe right to reciprocate interest, or left to eliminate the candidate.
- Direct connection between job seekers and employers allows hiring managers and job seekers to start an immediate conversation. Hiring managers can message with job seekers within the app, and both parties can quickly vet one another and decide whether to move forward.
- Easy profile creation from social media and in-app profile editing helps job seekers focus on finding a job.

=== Users ===
- Job Seekers can either load their profile manually or pull in professional credentials from social media. They can post validated photos on their Facebook account. Switch’s matching algorithm analyzes the job seeker’s location, experience, and skills to bring them jobs they may be interested in. Job seekers swipe to apply and, if the employer shows interest too, only then does Switch’s system reveal the job seeker’s identity to the corporate recruiter or hiring manager. The job seeker and hiring manager can then chat through the app.
- Employers behave similarly to job seekers. Hiring managers or corporate recruiters sign up online, add open positions, then view Switch-recommended candidates or wait for job seekers to swipe right. Employers can select relevant job seekers by swiping right on their profiles, then chat directly in the app.

=== Subscriptions ===
The app is currently free for users and employers.

== Company overview ==
=== Financials ===
Switch closed out its seed round in May 2015 with $2 million in seed round funding. Investors include Marker VC, Metamorphic, Rhodium, 500 Startups, BAM, SG VC and Marcel Legrand. In a July 2015 interview with Tadmor, he claimed that Switch had raised $2.4 million to date.

== Reception ==
Thanks to its swipe technology and double opt-in make-up, the media often refers to Switch as the Tinder for jobs. Switch has received features in lists and app reviews as an effective tool to improve your digital job search, particularly on the mobile platform.

“It’s minimal effort to connect with relevant matches,” said Good Morning America workplace contributor Tory Johnson. “Which is what everybody wants to find.”
