= Mode (video game) =

1996 video game

- Genre: full motion video game

Mode (1996) is the second of two published full motion video (FMV) interactive multimedia CD-ROM based collaborations between writer and director Jeff Green and the Animatics Multimedia Corporation.

== History ==
The success and international acclaim of their first title, Midnight Stranger in 1994, led to a production partnership and publishing arrangement with Corel Corporation, an expanded production budget, and the creation of an associated web site version called "Club Mode". Mode (1996) is the second of two published full motion video (FMV) interactive multimedia CD-ROM based collaborations between writer and director Jeff Green and the Animatics Multimedia Corporation. Mode was intended to be the launch vehicle for an expansion of Corel's CD Home Collection into the multimedia entertainment business; however, after a scathing review in PC Gamer magazine, Corel never fully released Mode, the division responsible for the CD Home Collection was shut down, and its software assets were sold to Hoffmann + Associates of Toronto.

== Plot ==
Experienced from the player's point-of-view (POV), users find themselves at the start of the game crashing an exclusive high-society fashion and art party on the top floor of an unnamed hotel hosted by anarchist artist Vito Brevis. The primary mystery at the heart of the event is Vito's true intentions. He appears cynical and anarchistic, but hidden information can be found that implies that he is actually part of a secret cabal that is using this event as some kind of supernatural ritual. The gameplay progresses through emotion-based interactions with other characters that are also attending the party, with the goal of creating in the player a feeling of shared intimacy with those characters.

== Gameplay ==
Like Midnight Stranger, Mode is video-based and also uses an emotional continuum Mood Bar for interaction with the in-story characters rather than a text interface or an itemized set of options for each interaction. In Midnight Stranger, the Mood Bar had been proven to simulate some of the frustration and uncertainty of dealing with other people in social situations, and provide a more realistic role playing experience, and so was used similarly in Mode. The red, left end of the bar represents a negative response ("no", "I disagree", "I don't like that"), the blue central part of the band represents a neutral response ("I don't know", "I don't care", "I have no opinion"), and the green right end of the bar represents a positive response ("yes", "I agree", "I like that"). While the bar is a smooth colour gradient that shows no clear demarcations, giving the illusion of infinite choice, practically there were usually only a few possible pathways from any given bar, with varying percentages of the bar devoted to the choices depending on circumstance.

Mode had more material than Midnight Stranger, and was distributed on 3 CD-ROMs; however, it continued to use the technique of embedding small frames of video into full screen still frames to save disk space — usually the head and shoulders of the speaking character being the only part of the frame that moved. This embedded video technique allowed many times more interactive material to be included on the disks than could have been done with full-screen video (even if highly compressed), and thus allowed greater freedom in storytelling and a more diverse cast within the technical limitations of the CD-ROM format. This approach was both lauded and criticized in published reviews, since it is a clever solution yet often created distracting disjoints between character motion and the framing image.

== Cast and crew ==
- Writer and director — Jeff Green
- Producer — Alfredo Coppola, Animatics Multimedia Corporation
- Publisher — Corel Corporation
- Crew — Video Producer: Jeff Lively; Multimedia Producer: Don Aker; Art Director: Tero Hollo; Music: Tim Kohout, Dan Proulx; Director Of Photography: Scott Plante, Visualeyes Productions; Associate Producers: Christine Doyle, Krista Thompson; Production Manager: Sonja Kruitwagen; Production Coordinator: Eileen Keefe; Sound Technician: Eldy Gouthro; Digital Media Manipulator: Warren Hodgson; Animation and Effects: Teddy MacLeod; Digitizing: James Hall; Graphic Designer: Jim Dicker; Gaffer: John Oliver; Key Grip: Michael Tien; Props: Jean-Sébastien Busque; Props Assistant: Kent Osgood; Wardrobe Coordinator: Celine Richardson; Head Dresser: Sheila Snapper; Makeup Artist: Samantha Caldwell; Hair Stylist: Lawrence Finnie; Body Painting: Jef (Krunchie) Harris, Sylvie Rochon
- Cast — Chip Chuipka (Vito Brevis), Natalie Grey (Charity Flame), Daniel Richer (Riel Attaychek), Quinn (Ed Cheminoma), W. David Watson (Jack Neetch), Gloria David (Mia Tesla), Alexandre Lincourt (Hercule Anaste), Katja Dolleato (Bela), Luigi Saracino (Killer Klown), Nathalie Coutu (The Dome Lady), Kent Rowe (Tuba), Cynthia Smith (Sheeva)
- Additional performances — The Ambient People (Denise, Hound, Robin, Alex, Chrystine), Johnathan Parker, The James Sisters, Dirt Farm, Tim Kohout and friends.
- Body Paint Models — Vanessa LaBelle, Meriel Meeks, Karan Friis, Jamie Durie
- Barrett Palmer Models — Nicole Harod, Sara Ducharme, Erin Downie, Parnille Holt Sawaya, Silvia DiNardo, Isabelle Mousseau, Sandra Guerard, Angela Selkirk, Alana Husson, Maganda Lumbu, Erin Binks, Joni-Sarah White

== Awards ==
- 1996 — Mode was a finalist for the Macromedia People's Choice Award, 1996 Macromedia International User's Conference
- 1997 — Club Mode was a finalist at the International Digital Media Awards, Multimedia '97

== Reception ==
Mode was intended to be the launch vehicle for an expansion of Corel's CD Home Collection into the multimedia entertainment business, however it received a scathing review in PC Gamer magazine. After this review, Corel never fully released Mode. Mode did receive many favourable reviews at the time, and has since developed an international fan base. Edited playthroughs by one player posted on YouTube between 2012 and 2014 have collectively received over 100,000 views.
