= Modality (book) =

Linguistic Realities: An Autonomist Metatheory for the Generative Enterprise
- Author: Paul Portner
- Language: English
- Subject: linguistic modality
- Publisher: Oxford University Press
- Publication date: 2009

Modality is a non-fiction book by the semanticist Paul Portner. The book, first published by the Oxford University Press in 2009, lays out the basic problems in linguistic modality and some of the standard approaches to solving them.

== Reception ==
The book was reviewed by Valentine Hacquard and Ferenc Kiefer.

== Bibliography ==
- Portner, Paul (2009). Modality. Oxford, UK: Oxford University Press. ISBN 9780199292431.
