= Switch (2012 film) =

2012 documentary film

Switch is a documentary film on global energy directed by Harry Lynch, produced and distributed by Arcos Films, and featuring Scott W. Tinker, a geologist and energy researcher who runs the Bureau of Economic Geology, a 200-person research unit of The University of Texas at Austin. and is a professor at the Jackson School of Geosciences.

The film is part of a larger energy education and efficiency project, which also includes the Switch Energy Project website, with additional video content and educational programs. The website includes interviews with energy policy analysts such as Ernie Moniz, former under secretary of energy, Steven E. Koonin, deputy executive director of the International Energy Agency, Richard Jones, and physicist Richard A. Muller.

The film aims to be a nonpartisan, scientifically based exploration of the energy transition from the traditional energies of coal and oil to future energies. It has been accepted by many environmental groups, government agencies, fossil and renewable energy companies and academic institutions.

Switch premiered at the 2012 Environmental Film Festival in Washington DC to positive reviews, then played at 12 other international festivals, most of them environmentally focused, and at 6 international geology conferences, before opening in theaters in New York in September 2012.

== Synopsis ==
Switch begins in Norway, where Dr. Tinker explores an electricity system built on renewable hydropower. There, he asks the central question of the film: what will the energy transition look like for the rest of us. Over the following 90 minutes, he travels the world to find out. His first step is to calculate how much energy the average person uses in a year, including all the energy embodied in the food and products we consume, the roads and public buildings we share. He uses that figure to measure and compare each energy type he visits.

Tinker starts with the big conventional energies, coal and oil, trying to determine their futures. Can coal be clean? Will we keep using it? Will oil price keep rising? Will we run out of it? He then examines the energies that may replace them. For oil, those are biofuels, natural gas and electricity. For coal, they are geothermal, solar, wind, natural gas and nuclear.

With each type, he visits various facilities, talks to the experts in the Department of Energy, universities, and gives an analysis of each resource’s major pros and cons.

After his journey, he assembles his findings to map out the likely energy future. While coal and oil will continue to play a large role especially in developing countries, a global transition to where their alternatives become dominant will happen in about 50 years. Renewables see by far the largest growth rate, while natural gas makes up the largest portion of the replacement, with nuclear approximately equal in share to renewables.

Tinker ends by emphasizing that energy efficiency, including personal energy conservation, will play a vital and growing role in a successful energy future: “The most important thing is to change the way we think about energy, so we can change the way we use it.”

== Reviews ==
"Switch is refreshingly free of hot air. It’s almost shocking in the way it sidesteps the kind of issue advocacy made commonplace by filmmakers Michael Moore, Davis Guggenheim and the like. Lynch’s film tries (and largely succeeds) in taking a scrupulously neutral tack between extremes." - The Washington Post

"Sidestepping the usual eco-docu strategy, Switch takes a far less hysterical route. Lynch’s method gives a rational evaluation of where the world is heading. It’s considerably more honest, and manages to be quite effective. Tech credits are tops, particularly the seamless editing and the often beautiful photography.” - Variety

"Tinker comes across as affable, reasonable, and unfailingly curious. His interview subjects are technicians, business executives, scientists, government officials. It insures a tone of dispassionate seriousness and good will." - Boston Globe

"Tinker takes us along for this beautifully shot ride, excellent in its details, and mixes a kind of gee-whiz wonderment at the way energy is produced with pithy, on-the-mark observations about the realities of those sources. He foresees the increasing use of renewables, natural gas and nuclear power in the US. But he also offers a sobering forecast of why we’re unlikely to shake coal and oil for a long time." - Austin American-Statesman

"There's no one solution to solving the energy crisis, but that's where Switch provides a valuable resource. In addition to the film, the Switch Energy Project also provides a deep video archive of the many interviews Dr. Tinker captured and used throughout the film." - TreeHugger

== Education ==
As of 2013, Switch is currently screening at university campuses as part of an energy awareness and efficiency program sponsored by the Geological Society of America.

The website mentions an upcoming primary education program being co-developed with the American Geosciences Institute.
