= Paul Portner =

American linguist

Paul Portner (born 1966) is an American linguist and Professor of Linguistics at Georgetown University. He is known for his works on linguistic modality.

== Books ==
- Modality, Oxford University Press (Studies in Semantics and Pragmatics)
- What is Meaning?, Blackwell
- Mood, Oxford University Press.
