= Longitudinal-section mode =

Longitudinal-section modes are a set of a particular kind of electromagnetic transmission modes found in some types of transmission line. They are a subset of hybrid electromagnetic modes (HEM modes). HEM modes are those modes that have both an electric field and a magnetic field component longitudinally in the direction of travel of the propagating wave. Longitudinal-section modes, additionally, have a component of either magnetic or electric field that is zero in one transverse direction. In longitudinal-section electric (LSE) modes this field component is electric. In longitudinal-section magnetic (LSM) modes the zero field component is magnetic. Hybrid modes are to be compared to transverse modes which have, at most, only one component of either electric or magnetic field in the longitudinal direction.

== Derivation and notation ==
There is an analogy between the way transverse modes (TE and TM modes) are arrived at and the definition of longitudinal section modes (LSE and LSM modes). When determining whether a structure can support a particular TE mode, one sets the electric field in the z direction (the longitudinal direction of the line) to zero and then solves Maxwell's equations for the boundary conditions set by the physical structure of the line. One can just as easily set the electric field in the x direction to zero and ask what modes that gives rise to. Such modes are designated LSE^{{x}} modes. Similarly there can be LSE^{{y}} modes and, analogously for the magnetic field, LSM^{{x}} and LSM^{{y}} modes. When dealing with longitudinal-section modes, the TE and TM modes are sometimes written as LSE^{{z}} and LSM^{{z}} respectively to produce a consistent set of notations and to reflect the analogous way in which they are defined.

Both LSE and LSM modes are a linear superposition of the corresponding TE and TM modes (that is, the modes with the same suffix numbers). Thus, in general, the LSE and LSM modes have a longitudinal component of both electric and magnetic field. Likewise the LSM modes are found by setting one of the transverse components of magnetic field to zero with analogous results.

== Occurrence ==
LSE and LSM modes can occur in some types of planar transmission line with non-homogeneous transmission media. There are some structures that are unable to support a pure TE or TM mode and consequently the transmission mode must necessarily be hybrid.

== Bibliography ==
- Zhang, Kequian; Li, Dejie, Electromagnetic Theory for Microwaves and Optoelectronics, Springer, 2013 ISBN 3-662-03553-7.
