= HSwMS Mode =

Several ships of the Swedish Navy have been named HSwMS Mode, (Note: "HSwMS" here stands for "Hans/Hennes Majestäts Skepp" - The prefix "HMS" is used in Sweden - the prefix "HSwMS" is used in international contexts to avoid confusion with ships of the British Royal Navy.) named after Módi, the son of Thor in Norse mythology:

- HSwMS Mode (1902) was a destroyer launched in 1902 and decommissioned in 1928 and sunk as target in 1936
- HSwMS Mode (29) was a Mode-class destroyer launched in 1942 and decommissioned in 1970
- HSwMS Mode (P154) was a Hugin-class patrol boat launched in 1978 and decommissioned in 2001
