= Cowboy Who? =

Canadian children's television series

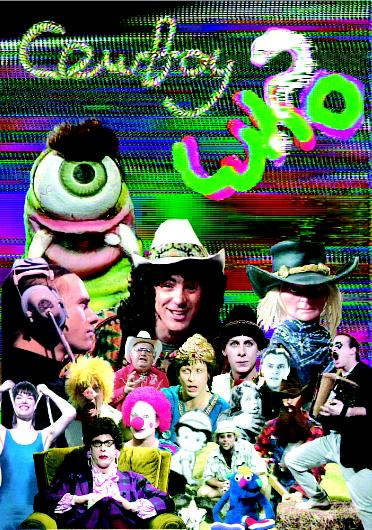
- Season one characters montage
- Starring: Rob Eastland; Mike Cormier; Jeff Green; Randy Kay; Kathleen Egan
- Country of origin: Canada
- Original language: English
- No. of episodes: 45

Production
- Running time: 30 mins

Original release
- Network: MCTV
- Release: 1990 – 1994

Cowboy Who? is an original 45 episode children's television series in Canada, which aired in a half-hour Sunday morning timeslot between 1990 and 1994 on the MCTV system. The show was a collaboration between then radio producer Jeff Green and the children's theatre group Salt & Pepper Theatre Company. In 1987, the Salt & Pepper Theatre Company had written and performed an 8-part series of 30 minute children's radio programs for Ottawa album oriented rock station CHEZ-FM on which Green had acted as producer and engineer. In addition, the theatre group had been involved with CHRO-TV, supplying children's theatre workshops in schools throughout the Ottawa Valley. When the Salt & Pepper Theatre Company were offered a regular slot on the station to help fulfill its CRTC license commitments for original local children's programming, they approached Green to collaborate on a series. In 1990, the team produced a pilot for Cowboy Who?, which gained them a commitment for a season of 13 episodes, and primary shooting began in the fall of that year. Two and a half more seasons were eventually created. The show spent several years in rotation on the MCTV stations.

The show was notable for its technical production values despite its obviously low budget, its humorous social commentary, a deliberate post-modernist structure (it is a television show about a television show that features numerous other television shows), and the cult following it developed during its run. It was further distinguished in that it was suitable for all ages (from infants to adults), and had a broad demographic appeal: providing puppets, cartoons, and on-screen behaviour appropriate to a pre-teen children's program (its ostensible target market); an overt anti-authoritarian angle for older children; and subtle adult humor designed to appeal to parents who were watching with their children. In 2005, a collaboration between Jeff Green and "DVD-Lab" software creator Roman Voska on Green's "Stranger Still" production led to the publication of the first season of Cowboy Who? as a DVD set.

== Overview ==
Each season was distinct from the others in that the overall structure of the show changed between them, and the cast of characters on the show's primary set (the "studio") decreased with each season as it focused more on content purportedly generated outside of the studio (e.g. "alien television programs"). In the third season, only "Cowboy Slim" is left, and in the final season, even he has left the studio — leaving in his place an "Automatic Telepathic Interface" that supposedly "reads the minds of the viewers" to choose what to show next — using an almost reductio ad absurdum minimalism as a means of deconstructing the television program as a medium of popular culture. The stylistic device of television programs within television programs was used to stave off heavy repetition by allowing the producers the freedom to insert near-random material into the individual shows. Heavy reliance was made throughout the production on short segments of other "shows" and "commercials" — all written, directed, and produced by the Cowboy Who? team, and featuring the primary set of performers, as well as performers brought in specifically to do the segments. Season one has a strong plotline that runs throughout the shows, and season two has three sub-plots that each run for most of the shows. Seasons three and four dispense with overarching plots, and use a premise to provide an almost variety show format — where season three has a host ("Cowboy Slim"), and season four features an "Automatic Telepathic Interface" that purportedly "allows the viewers to choose from a list of available programs by their thoughts".

Still from an opening title sequence of Cowboy Who?

Every episode featured unique opening title and closing credit segments produced specifically for the show in which they take place, often complementing a theme within the episode, and usually executed with sophisticated video effects. Furthermore, consistent in style and content within each of the four seasons, each episode had a unique introductory segment that was shown before the opening titles. In season one, each show had a mock "warning" (e.g. "WARNING! This program contains scenes of younger viewers that may not be suitable for violence and coarse language. Discressionary parenting is advised.") which was followed by a "crime log" by the character "Inspector O'Really" that was used to summarize the plot to that point of the season. In season two, every episode began with a warning again; however, in contrast to the "warning" in season one, the text was only on the screen long enough for a person to register the fact that a "warning" had been presented before it was obscured by a graphic from "Interstellar Broadcast" ("IB"). The purported intent of these warnings was to encourage viewers to tape the program off the air and watch it again later. The voice from "IB" announces that the show being watched is using an unauthorized "pirated" broadcast channel, and that the viewer should instead be watching an inane robotic "mandatory inter-species equal-time educational program" called "Watzit?" (a contraction of "What Is It?"). After about 20 seconds of "Watzit?", the "signal is re-acquired" by Cowboy Who? and the opening titles proceed. Season three featured a short segment called "Bonehead" featuring a plasticine skull and crossbones that provided safety "advice" to children watching (e.g. "Don't Play With Things!") that always concluded with the phrase "or that could make you a bone head!". And season four (of which there were only six episodes), featured a "Cowboy Quote", with the character "Cowboy Pat" delivering an incomprehensible bit of cowboy "wisdom" (e.g. "A cowboy's hat is like the leaf of a tree, it always comes off in the fall").

In addition to a large number of "one off" segments produced for the show, each season had a staple of regular features. Season one had two primary recurring segments: a nature show spoof entitled "Think About It! With Professor Dave", which was actually taped in Africa and features a misinformed slacker as its host; and "Trail of the Royal Mounted", an actual 1930s black and white serial re-edited and re-dubbed for comic effect. Season two features several recurring segments: "Tangled Webs" a loose parody of the documentary series In Search of...; "The Rugged Road To Learning", a re-dubbed 1910s black and white documentary; "Sally Polkadot", a stop-action puppet show that takes place in the enforced utopia "The Land of Lollypops" that pokes fun at stereotypical British children's shows; and "Esoteric Knowledge", a spoof of the low-budget 1960s films that used to be shown in science classes. Additionally, new or re-edited episodes of "Think About It!" are presented. In season three, much of each episode was occupied with the mostly live action and puppets "Dee Dee & Dwilfer" show, which had a number of regular sub-segments itself (see below), and which always ended with "Dee Dee" pressing a large "panic" button on her vest in frustration or shock at the behavior of the alien "Dwilfer". Season four's episodes are largely occupied by a live action and puppets show entitled "Mack's", which also features a number of regular sub-segments (see below). These episodes have a darker, more adult, atmosphere about them, and each "Mack's" segment ends with an automated "Evil Content Override" by "IB".

== Cast and crew ==
"Inspector O'Really" tries to wake up "Cowboy Slim" (the human) and "Smilin' Tom" (the puppet)

- Rob Eastland — performed the majority of the character roles. Wrote and performed the "Think About It! With Professor Dave" segment (which was filmed on location in Africa).
- Mike Cormier — head writer, and performed the key role of reluctant host "Cowboy Slim", as well as operating and voicing several puppets.
- Jeff Green — directed, produced, and edited the show. Performed the role of "Chip the Mystery Technician", voiced and operated the "Smilin' Tom" puppet. Wrote and voiced many segments such as "Trail of the Royal Mounted".
- Randy Kay – performed the role of "Mack Yavellian" in seasons three and four.
- Kathleen Egan – performed the role of "Tara" in season four.
- Real Darren Stevens – performed in the role of an alien twin "Rock & Roland" in season four.
- Bob Cowman – performed in the role of an alien twin "Rock & Roland" in season four.
- Matt Ficner — created the puppets, and operated and voiced the puppet "Dwilfer" in season three.
- Laura Jarrah — performed all the voices for the "Sally Polkadot" segment.
- Gerry Giraourd – performed the role of "Tom Selleck".
- Pat Leonard – performed the role of "Cowboy Pat".
- Margaret Cormier – child performer in the "Story Tales" segment.
- Maxfield Green – child performer in the "Story Tales" segment.
- Alexa Green – child performer in the "Story Tales" segment.
- Patricia Cormier – narrator for the "Story Tales" segment.

== Plot summary ==
=== Season one ===
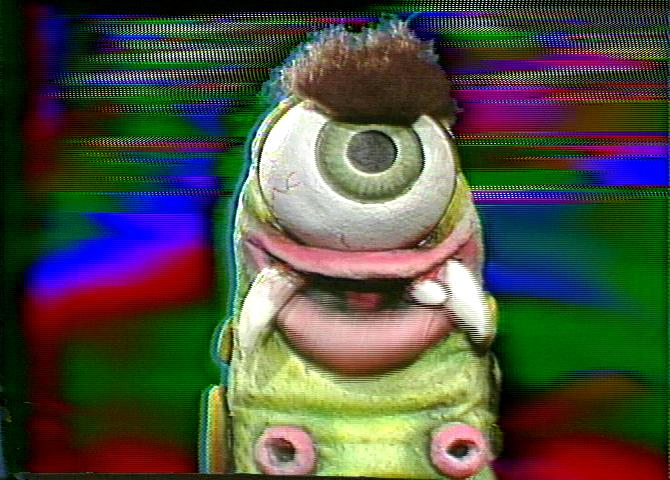
The "Evil Tom" malevolent alien character puppet

The first season of the series has a developing storyline which establishes the primary premise: the host of the lackluster "Cowboy Pat" show, a run-of-the-mill local children's show that has been on the air for thirty years, disappears in a mysterious flash of light, the oddly autonomous puppet co-host Smilin' Tom enlists the show's apathetic late-teen technician to fill his role, a mysterious figure in black named Chip appears to take over the technician's role, and a bumbling detective arrives to investigate the disappearance. In time Phyllis Blanding, a fussy woman from C.U.T.E.S.E.Y. (The Council for the Unification of Television Entertainment Standards Everywhere, Yahoo!) arrives to oversee their programming. The detective accuses the puppet of being an alien, which to everyone's surprise turns out to be true, a battle for control of the show occurs between a malevolent alien race and the co-hosts, and in the final scene of the season the entire studio building is accidentally launched into space as a result of this battle. Season one also includes numerous mock ads, the "Think about it! With Professor Dave" segment in which a rather empty-headed slacker tries to present nature programming, and "Trail of the Royal Mounted", an actual 1930s Canadian black and white serial re-edited and re-dubbed for comic effect.

=== Season two ===
Finding themselves in space, Slim, Smilin' Tom, Phyllis, and Chip discover that in space they are able to pick up the astonishing amount of television being broadcast by alien worlds, and they are able to navigate around the galaxy. In time they find that the broadcasting in the galaxy is controlled by a robotic entity called IB (Interstellar Broadcasting), and when an election is announced for the head of IB, Phyllis decides to run. Meanwhile, Smilin' Tom decides he has to find his long-lost twin brother and solicits a television program that specializes in solving mysteries, called "Tangled Webs", to help him in his search. Slim is kidnapped by an alien called Dipswitch but turns out to be just down the hall. Dipswitch is actually trying to connect with Chip, who leaves with him to become a transdimensional being. IB tries many things to keep Phyllis from winning the election, but she is eventually crowned Queen of the Universe and leaves to begin her rule. Smilin' Tom finds his brother running a video store in Peterborough and leaves to join him. The season includes many segments such as "The Rugged Road To Learning", a re-dubbed black and white documentary from 1910, "Sally Polkadot" a sweetly bizarre stop-action puppet show voiced by a British woman (Laura Jarrah), and "Esoteric Knowledge", a low-budget science show apparently from the 60s hosted by the generally misinformed Dr. Onius.

=== Season three ===
With only Slim left at the station he decides to solicit videos from the audience and otherwise just watches his favourite alien show, "Dee Dee & Dwilfer". The first segment is re-voiced videos from actual school children, the second segment is the "Dee Dee & Dwilfer" show, which has a female host stuck on an alien planet who is helped by a puppet alien named Dwilfer to put on a kid's show. The Dee Dee & Dwilfer show-within-the-show includes several regular segments: "Earthview" is a series of questions supposedly asked of regular school children, but the questions that appear as titles are actually quite different from the ones the children were in fact answering; "Time for Tots" is stories read by Mack Yavellian, who was apparently a technician on Dee Dee's ship but who has been recruited as a reader (he picks inappropriate material, like Edgar Allan Poe); "The Music Box" is a tiny girl in a cigar box held by Dwilfer who sings country songs, but when he starts to sing along he always knocks the box and sends her flying; "Gilbert the Educated Fish" is a talking fish puppet that complains about pollution; and "Story Tales" is little kids acting out fables in a bluescreen environment that sets them against children's drawings of the story locale. In the third show segment Slim in the studio kills the time by tuning in random shows, some apparently alien in origin, others from Earth, and the last show always cleverly wove the show credits into the content. The third season always began with a segment called "Bonehead", a plasticine skull & crossbones that warned children about the dangers of doing almost anything (e.g. "Don't Play With Things!"). Smilin' Tom makes a guest appearance on Dee Dee & Dwilfer in show 7, and in the last episode Tom appears again and at the very end Cowboy Pat appears on the set as he disappeared at the series' opening.

=== Season four ===
For the last season only six episodes were ordered. Each episode began with a "Cowboy Quote", with Cowboy Pat delivering an odd bit of cowboy wisdom (e.g. "A cowboy's hat is like the leaf of a tree, it always comes off in the fall"). Apparently Cowboy Slim has finally left the studio and left in his place an Automatic Telepathic Interface that allows the viewers to choose from a list of available programs by their thoughts. For some reason viewers always choose "Mack's" which is a show inexplicably given to Mack Yavellian, the somber story reader from the previous season's "Dee Dee & Dwilfer" show. This show has Mack co-hosting with a beleaguered young woman named Tara and a red serpent puppet named Billsy Bubb. Mack seems only interested in showing videos from his "band", who strongly resist all his attempts to guide them to commercial success. He has also arranged for two segments: "Expozany", which is obviously a somewhat strange friend of his who hosts a conspiracy-themed show that he has shot in his basement while wearing a clown mask, and "Esoteric Knowledge", a revisiting of a fictional 60s science "educational" science show starring the remarkably ill-informed Dr. Onius. Tara tries to counter all the darkness of the show with episodes of "Story Tales" as seen in season three. Meanwhile, Billsy tries to make the themes of the shows one of the seven deadly sins, and when he becomes especially impassioned his eyes begin to glow and a sequence is triggered featuring a comically evil puppet called Hobnob that spouts ridiculous curses. This sequence is always interrupted by the automatic interface ("Evil Content Override"). When the automatic interface comes back it always malfunctions, causing a random scan of available channels that show a wide variety of show fragments and fake ads.
