= Switching =

Switching may refer to:

== Computing and technology ==
- Switching, functions performed by a switch:
  - Electronic switching
  - Packet switching, a digital networking communications methodology
    - LAN switching, packet switching on Local Area Networks
  - Telephone switching, the activity performed by a telephone exchange (telephone switching machine)
- Switching, a synonym for shunting in rail transport

== Other uses ==
- Switching (ecology), a pattern of predation describing predators' selection of food based on its abundance
- Switching (film), a 2003 Danish interactive film
- Switching (pickleball), when doubles partners switch sides of their court
- Code-switching, of languages
- Immunoglobulin class switching, an immunological mechanism that changes the type of antibody produced by B cells
- Task switching (psychology), an experimental research paradigm used in cognitive psychology

== See also ==
- Switch (disambiguation)
