= Mode (electromagnetism) =

Field pattern of propagating waves

The mode of electromagnetic systems describes the field pattern of the propagating waves.

Some of the classifications of electromagnetic modes include;

- Modes in waveguides and transmission lines. These modes are analogous to the normal modes of vibration in mechanical systems.
  - Transverse modes, modes that have at least one of the electric field and magnetic field entirely in a transverse direction.
    - Transverse electromagnetic mode (TEM), as with a free space plane wave, both the electric field and magnetic field are entirely transverse.
    - Transverse electric (TE) modes, only the electric field is entirely transverse. Also notated as H modes to indicate there is a longitudinal magnetic component.
    - Transverse magnetic (TM) modes, only the magnetic field is entirely transverse. Also notated as E modes to indicate there is a longitudinal electric component.
  - Hybrid electromagnetic (HEM) modes, both the electric and magnetic fields have a component in the longitudinal direction. They can be analysed as a linear superposition of the corresponding TE and TM modes.
    - HE modes, hybrid modes in which the TE component dominates.
    - EH modes, hybrid modes in which the TM component dominates.
    - Longitudinal-section modes
      - Longitudinal-section electric (LSE) modes, hybrid modes in which the electric field in one of the transverse directions is zero
      - Longitudinal-section magnetic (LSM) modes, hybrid modes in which the magnetic field in one of the transverse directions is zero
  - The term eigenmode is used both as a synonym for mode and as the eigenfunctions in a eigenmode expansion analysis of waveguides.
    - Similarly natural modes arise in the singular expansion method of waveguide analysis and characteristic modes arise in characteristic mode analysis.
- Modes in other structures
  - Bloch modes, modes of Bloch waves; these occur in periodically repeating structures.

Mode names are sometimes prefixed with quasi-, meaning that the mode is not quite pure. For instance, quasi-TEM mode has a small component of longitudinal field.
