= Bridged T delay equaliser =

The bridged-T delay equaliser is an electrical all-pass filter circuit utilising bridged-T topology whose purpose is to insert an (ideally) constant delay at all frequencies in the signal path. It is a class of image filter.

== Applications ==
The network is used when it is required that two or more signals are matched to each other on some form of timing criterion. Delay is added to all other signals so that the total delay is matched to the signal which already has the longest delay. In television broadcasting, for instance, it is desirable that the timing of the television waveform synchronisation pulses from different sources are aligned as they reach studio control rooms or network switching centres. This ensures that cuts between sources do not result in disruption at the receivers. Another application occurs when stereophonic sound is connected by landline, for instance from an outside broadcast to the studio centre. It is important that delay is equalised between the two stereo channels as a difference will destroy the stereo image. When the landlines are long and the two channels arrive by substantially different routes it can require many filter sections to fully equalise the delay.

== Operation ==
The operation is best explained in terms of the phase shift the network introduces. At low frequencies L is low impedance and C' is high impedance and consequently the signal passes through the network with no shift in phase. As the frequency increases, the phase shift gradually increases, until at some frequency, ω_{0}, the shunt branch of the circuit, L'C', goes in to resonance and causes the centre-tap of L to be short-circuited to ground. Transformer action between the two halves of L, which had been steadily becoming more significant as the frequency increased, now becomes dominant. The winding of the coil is such that the secondary winding produces an inverted voltage to the primary. That is, at resonance the phase shift is now 180°. As the frequency continues to increase, the phase delay also continues to increase and the input and output start to come back into phase as a whole cycle delay is approached. At high frequencies L and L' approach open-circuit and C approaches short-circuit and the phase delay tends to level out at 360°.

The relationship between phase shift (φ) and time delay (T_{D}) with angular frequency (ω) is given by the simple relation,

$$\phi = \omega T_D \,$$

It is required that T_{D} is constant at all frequencies over the band of operation. φ must, therefore, be kept linearly proportional to ω. With a suitable choice of parameters, the network phase shift can be made linear up to about 180° phase shift.

The network is terminated in a characteristic impedance (not shown in the circuit diagram), ideally a resistance R, which is the input impedance to the successive circuit or transmission line.

== Design ==
The four component values of the network provide four degrees of freedom in the design. It is required from image theory (see Zobel network) that the L/C branch and the L'/C' branch are the dual of each other (ignoring the transformer action) which provides two parameters for calculating component values. These are

$C' = \frac{4L}{R^2}$ and $L' = CR^2$

Equivalently, every transmission pole, s_{p} in the s-domain left half-plane must have a matching zero, s_{z} in the right half-plane such that s_{p}=−s_{z}. A third parameter is set by choosing a resonant frequency, this is set to (at least) the maximum frequency the network is required to operate at.

$$\omega_0 = \frac{1}{\sqrt{4LC}} = \frac{1}{\sqrt{L'C'}}$$

There is one remaining degree of freedom that the designer can use to maximally linearise the phase/frequency response. This parameter is usually stated as the L/C ratio. As stated above, it is not practical to linearise the phase response above 180°, i.e. half a cycle, so once a maximum frequency of operation, f_{m} is chosen, this sets the maximum delay that can be designed in to the circuit and is given by,

$$T_{D(max)} = \frac{1}{2f_m}$$

For broadcast sound purposes, 15 kHz is often chosen as the maximum usable frequency on landlines. A delay equaliser designed to this specification can, therefore, insert a delay of 33μs. In reality, the differential delay that might be required to equalise may be many hundreds of microseconds. A chain of many sections in tandem will be required. For television purposes, a maximum frequency of 6 MHz might be chosen, which corresponds to a delay of 83ns. Again, many sections may be required to fully equalise. In general, much greater attention is paid to the routing and exact length of television cables because many more equaliser sections are required to remove the same delay difference as compared to audio.

== Superconductor planar implementation ==
2.8 GHz superconducting bridged T delay equaliser in YBCO on lanthanum aluminate substrate

Losses in the circuit cause the maximum delay to be reduced, a problem that can be ameliorated with the use of high-temperature superconductors. Such a circuit has been realised as a lumped-element planar implementation in thin-film using microstrip technology. The traces are the superconductor yttrium barium copper oxide and the substrate is lanthanum aluminate. The circuit is for use in the microwave band and has a centre frequency of approximately 2.8 GHz and achieves a peak group delay of 0.7 ns. The device operates at a temperature of 77 K. The layout of the components corresponds to the layout shown in the circuit diagram at the head of this article, except that the relative positions of L' and C' have been interchanged so that C' can be implemented as a capacitance to ground. One plate of this capacitor is the ground plane and it thus has a much simpler pattern (a simple rectangle) than the pattern of C which needs to be a series capacitor in the main transmission line.

== See also ==
- All-pass filter
- Lattice phase equaliser
- Bartlett's bisection theorem
- Zobel network
