= Constant-resistance network =

A constant-resistance network in electrical engineering is a network whose input resistance does not change with frequency when correctly terminated. Examples of constant resistance networks include:

- Zobel network
- Lattice phase equaliser
- Boucherot cell
- Bridged T delay equaliser
