= Phaser (effect) =

Sweeping audio effect

Phaser on strings synth
A short, unprocessed string sample, followed by a few different phasing effects on the same sample

Phaser on drums
A short, unprocessed drum sample, followed by the same sample with a slow phasing effect

phaser on distorted guitar

A phaser or phase shifter is an electronic sound processor used to filter a signal by creating a series of peaks and troughs in the frequency spectrum. The position of the peaks and troughs of the waveform being affected is typically modulated by an internal low-frequency oscillator so that they vary over time, creating a sweeping effect.

Phasers are often used to give a synthesized or electronic effect to natural sounds, such as human speech.

== Process ==
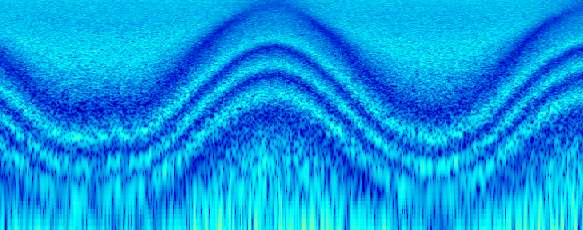
Spectrogram of an 8-stage phaser modulated by a sine LFO applied to white noise. X-axis is time, Y-axis is frequency, and color indicates amplitude.

The electronic phasing effect is created by splitting an audio signal into two paths. One path treats the signal with an all-pass filter, which preserves the amplitude of the original signal and alters the phase. The amount of change in phase depends on the frequency. When signals from the two paths are mixed, the frequencies that are out of phase will cancel each other out, creating the phaser's characteristic notches. Changing the mix ratio changes the depth of the notches; the deepest notches occur when the mix ratio is 50%.

The definition of phaser typically excludes such devices where the all-pass section is a delay line; such a device is called a flanger.

== Structure ==
Traditional electronic phasers use a series of variable all-pass phase-shift networks which alter the phases of the different frequency components in the signal. These networks pass all frequencies at equal volume, introducing only phase change to the signal. Human ears are not very responsive to phase differences, but this creates audible interferences when mixed back with the dry (unprocessed) signal, creating notches. The simplified structure of a mono phaser is shown below:

The number of all-pass filters (usually called stages) varies with different models; some analog phasers offer 4, 6, 8 or 12 stages. Digital phasers may offer up to 32 or even more. This determines the number of notches/peaks in the sound, affecting the general sound character. A phaser with n stages generally has n/2 notches in the spectrum, so a 4-stage phaser will have two notches.

Additionally, the output can be fed back to the input for a more intense effect, creating a resonant effect by emphasizing frequencies between notches. This involves feeding the output of the all-pass filter chain back to the input, as shown here:

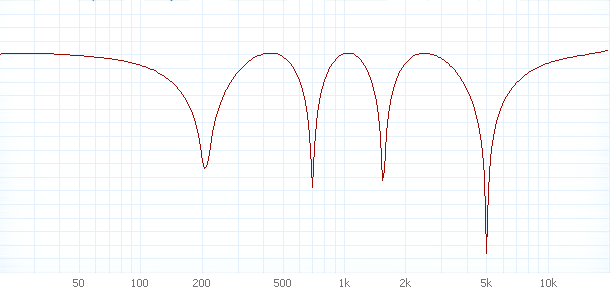
Measured frequency response of an 8-stage phaser with no feedback, dry/wet ratio: 50/50%

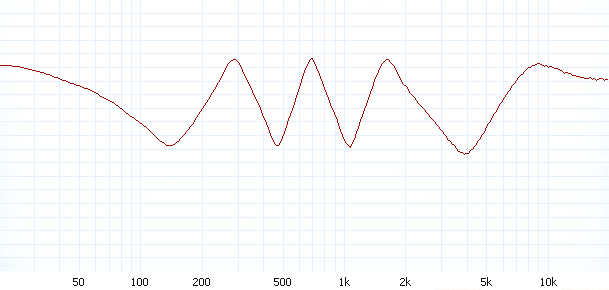
Measured frequency response of an 8-stage phaser with 50% feedback, dry/wet ratio: 50/50%

The frequency response of an 8-stage phaser with or without feedback is shown. Note that the peaks between the notches are sharper when there's feedback, giving a distinct sound.

A stereo phaser is usually two identical phasers modulated by a quadrature signal; the outputs of the oscillators for the left and right channels are a quarter-wave out of phase.

Many modern phasers are implemented using digital signal processing, often emulating analog phasers. Phasers are mostly found as plugins for sound editing software, as a part of a monolithic rackmount sound effect unit, or as stompbox guitar effects.

== Usage ==
Video demonstration of a phaser pedal on electric guitar (Maxon PT999 Phase Tone)

The term was often used to refer to the original tape flanging effect heard on many psychedelic records of the late 1960s, notably "Itchycoo Park" (1967) by the Small Faces. The Eventide Instant Phaser from 1971 was one of the first studio devices to emulate the tape flanging effect (with all-pass filters instead of delay, thus being one of the first to distinguish phasing from flanging). It was widely employed in the studio and in live settings by artists such as Led Zeppelin and Todd Rundgren. Phasing is a popular effect for electric guitar. In 1968, Shin-ei's Uni-Vibe effects pedal, designed by audio engineer Fumio Mieda, incorporated phase shift, soon becoming favorite effects of guitarists such as Jimi Hendrix and Robin Trower.

By the early 1970s, phasing was available as a portable guitar effect, the first being the Maestro Phase Shifter PS-1 designed by Tom Oberheim. Unlike other phase shifters to follow, the Maestro PS-1 had three buttons to control the speed: slow, medium, and fast speed. (Note: Maestro would later issue the PS-1B which had a speed control knob.) Notable users of the Maestro Phase Shifter were John Paul Jones of Led Zeppelin, Alex Lifeson of Rush, Waylon Jennings and Ernie Isley of The Isley Brothers. Another notable early example was the MXR Phase 90 which featured a control knob for speed control. From 1974, Steve Hackett of Genesis, in the Selling England by the Pound (1973) studio album and tour, used the MXR Phase 90 for his Les Pauls, and from The Lamb Lies Down On Broadway (1974) album and tour, used the phase filter section in his Electronic Music Studios Synthi Hi-Fli. In country music, Waylon Jennings was a notable user of the phaser effect, particularly prominent on "Are You Sure Hank Done It This Way" (1975). In the late 1970s, Brian May used large amounts of phasing, in such songs as "Sheer Heart Attack". In the late 1970s and 1980s, Eddie Van Halen often used the MXR Phase 90 as part of his signal chain, for example in the instrumental "Eruption" and on the song "Atomic Punk".

Stereo phaser on a Fender Rhodes (VSTi)
A short, unprocessed Fender Rhodes sample, followed by the same sample with a stereo phasing effect

Keyboard players also used phasing: in the 1970s, keyboard instruments like the Fender Rhodes electric piano, the Eminent 310 electronic organ, and the Clavinet were commonly treated with a phaser, especially in avant-garde jazz. Bill Evans, for instance, used a Maestro phaser on Intuition (1974). The phaser is also used to "sweeten" their sounds. Examples can be heard in Billy Joel's "Just The Way You Are", Styx's "Babe", and Jean Michel Jarre's Oxygène (1976) on which he used an EHX Small Stone phaser extensively. Tony Banks (Genesis) used an MXR Phase 100 on his RMI 368x Electra piano from 1974 (later he inserted this effect, as well as the fuzzbox, into the Electra's panel); from late 1977 he also used the phaser (along with a Boss CE-1) on his Hammond organ to replace the Leslie's rotating effect. Daft Punk helped to re-popularize the effect in the 21st century, utilizing it on a number of tracks on their Discovery album in 2001. Richard Tee also used a phase shifter hooked up to his Fender Rhodes.

In motion picture or television production, the effect created by a phaser is often used to imply that the sound is synthetically generated, like turning a natural human voice into a computer or robot voice. The technique works because the frequency filtering produces sound commonly associated with mechanical sources, which only generate specific frequencies, rather than natural sources, which produce a range of frequencies. Vocoder and ring modulation are also used to create synthetic effects.

== Similar effects ==
A specific type of phasing, flanging is a similar effect, in which the notches are linearly spaced. In a flanger effect, the notches are created by mixing the signal with a delayed version of itself. Flangers tend to sound more pronounced and natural, like the "jet plane whoosh" effect, whereas phasers tend to sound more subtle and otherworldly. For comparison of the two effects, check Flanging § Comparison with phase shifting.

The Uni-Vibe is an early phase-shifting effect that uses photoresistors for modulation.

== See also ==
- Chorus effect
- Shepard tone
- Wave interference
