= Bartlett's bisection theorem =

Bartlett's bisection theorem is an electrical theorem in network analysis attributed to Albert Charles Bartlett. The theorem shows that any symmetrical two-port network can be transformed into a lattice network. The theorem often appears in filter theory where the lattice network is sometimes known as a filter X-section following the common filter theory practice of naming sections after alphabetic letters to which they bear a resemblance.

The theorem as originally stated by Bartlett required the two halves of the network to be topologically symmetrical. The theorem was later extended by Wilhelm Cauer to apply to all networks which were electrically symmetrical. That is, the physical implementation of the network is not of any relevance. It is only required that its response in both halves are symmetrical.

== Applications ==
Lattice topology filters are not very common. The reason for this is that they require more components (especially inductors) than other designs. Ladder topology is much more popular. However, they do have the property of being intrinsically balanced and a balanced version of another topology, such as T-sections, may actually end up using more inductors. One application is for all-pass phase correction filters on balanced telecommunication lines. The theorem also makes an appearance in the design of crystal filters at RF frequencies. Here ladder topologies have some undesirable properties, but a common design strategy is to start from a ladder implementation because of its simplicity. Bartlett's theorem is then used to transform the design to an intermediate stage as a step towards the final implementation (using a transformer to produce an unbalanced version of the lattice topology).

== Definition and proof ==
=== Definition ===

Start with a two-port network N with a plane of symmetry between the two ports. Next cut N through its plane of symmetry to form two new identical two-ports 1/2N. Connect two identical voltage generators to the two ports of N. It is clear from the symmetry that no current is going to flow through any branch passing through the plane of symmetry. The impedance measured into a port of N under these circumstances will be the same as the impedance measured if all the branches passing through the plane of symmetry were open circuit. It is therefore the same impedance as the open circuit impedance of 1/2N. Let us call that impedance $Z_\text{oc}$.

Now consider the network N with two identical voltage generators connected to the ports but with opposite polarity. Just as superposition of currents through the branches at the plane of symmetry must be zero in the previous case, by analogy and applying the principle of duality, superposition of voltages between nodes at the plane of symmetry must likewise be zero in this case. The input impedance is thus the same as the short circuit impedance of 1/2N. Let us call that impedance $Z_\text{sc}$.

Bartlett's bisection theorem states that the network N is equivalent to a lattice network with series branches of $Z_\text{sc}$ and cross branches of $Z_\text{oc}$.

=== Proof ===

Consider the lattice network shown with identical generators E connected to each port. It is clear from symmetry and superposition that no current is flowing in the series branches $Z_\text{sc}$. Those branches can thus be removed and left open circuit without any effect on the rest of the circuit. This leaves a circuit loop with a voltage of 2E and an impedance of $2Z_\text{oc}$ giving a current in the loop of
$$I = \frac{2E}{2Z_\text{oc}}$$
and an input impedance of
$$\frac{E}{I} = Z_\text{oc},$$
as it is required to be for equivalence to the original two-port.

Similarly, reversing one of the generators results, by an identical argument, in a loop with an impedance of $2Z_\text{sc}$ and an input impedance of
$$\frac{E}{I} = Z_\text{sc}.$$

Recalling that these generator configurations are the precise way in which $Z_\text{oc}$ and $Z_\text{sc}$ were defined in the original two-port, it is proved that the lattice is equivalent for those two cases. It is proved that this is so for all cases by considering that all other input and output conditions can be expressed as a linear superposition of the two cases already proved.

== Examples ==
Lattice equivalent of a T-section high-pass filter

Lattice equivalent of a Zobel bridge-T low-pass filter

It is possible to use the Bartlett transformation in reverse; that is, to transform a symmetrical lattice network into some other symmetrical topology. The examples shown above could just as equally have been shown in reverse. However, unlike the examples above, the result is not always physically realisable with linear passive components. This is because there is a possibility the reverse transform will generate components with negative values. Negative quantities can only be physically realised with active components present in the network.

== Extension of the theorem ==
Example of impedance and frequency scaling using a Π-section low-pass filter prototype. In the first transformation, the prototype is bisected and the cut-off frequency is rescaled from 1 rad/s to 10^{5} rad/s (15.9 kHz). In the second transformation, the bisected network is rescaled on the left side to operate at 600 Ω and on the right side to operate at 50 Ω.

There is an extension to Bartlett's theorem that allows a symmetrical filter network operating between equal input and output impedance terminations to be modified for unequal source and load impedances. This is an example of impedance scaling of a prototype filter. The symmetrical network is bisected along its plane of symmetry. One half is impedance-scaled to the input impedance and the other is scaled to the output impedance. The response shape of the filter remains the same. This does not amount to an impedance matching network, the impedances looking in to the network ports bear no relationship to the termination impedances. This means that a network designed by Bartlett's theorem, while having exactly the filter response predicted, also adds a constant attenuation in addition to the filter response. In impedance matching networks, a usual design criterion is to maximise power transfer. The output response is "the same shape" relative to the voltage of the theoretical ideal generator driving the input. It is not the same relative to the actual input voltage which is delivered by the theoretical ideal generator via its load impedance.

The constant gain due to the difference in input and output impedances is given by;

$$A=\frac{V_2}{E}=\frac{2R_2}{R_1 + R_2}$$

Note that it is possible for this to be greater than unity, that is, a voltage gain is possible, but power is always lost.
