= Boucherot cell =

This article relates to loudspeaker driving. See Zobel network for a more general description of telecommunications usage.

Boucherot cell correcting loudspeaker impedance

A Boucherot cell is an electronic filter, used in audio amplifiers to damp high-frequency oscillations that might occur in the absence of loads at high frequencies. Named after Paul Boucherot a Boucherot cell typically consists of a resistor and capacitor in series, usually placed across a load for stability.

It is commonly seen in analog power amplifiers at the output of the driver stage, just before the output inductor. The speaker coil inductance of a loudspeaker generates a rising impedance, which is worsened by the output inductor generally found in analog power amplifiers; the cell is used to limit this impedance.

The documentation for some power operation amplifiers suggests the use of a "Boucherot cell between outputs and ground or across the load".

Additionally, Boucherot cells are sometimes used across the bass driver (and mid-range) of a speaker system, in order to maintain a more constant driving point impedance as "seen" by a passive crossover. In this specific arrangement, the Boucherot cell is part of a Zobel network.

Some loudspeaker crossover designs aim to stabilize impedance at high frequencies by including Zobel networks.

== See also ==
- RC snubber
