= Reflectometer =

Some scientific instruments commonly designated reflectometer are:

- Vector network analyser (VNA)
- Optical time domain reflectometer
- Reflectometer (electronics): In electronics, a directional coupler containing matched calibrated detectors in both arms of the auxiliary line, or a pair of single-detector couplers oriented so as to measure the electrical power flowing in both directions in the main line
- Spectrophotometer: in optics, an instrument for measuring the reflectivity or reflectance of reflecting surfaces
- Time-domain reflectometer

== See also ==
- Retroreflector
