= Noise-domain reflectometry =

Noise-domain reflectometry is a type of reflectometry where the reflectometer exploits existing data signals on wiring and does not have to generate any signals itself. Noise-domain reflectometry, like time-domain and spread-spectrum time domain reflectometers, is most often used in identifying the location of wire faults in electrical lines.

Time-domain reflectometers work by generating a signal and then sending that signal down the wireline and examining the reflected signal. Noise-domain reflectometers (NDRs) provide the benefit of locating wire faults without introducing an external signal because the NDR examines the existing signals on the line to identify wire faults. This technique is particularly useful in the testing of live wires where data integrity on the wires is critical. For example, NDRs can be used for monitoring aircraft wiring while in flight.

== See also ==
- Spread-spectrum time-domain reflectometry
- Time-domain reflectometry
