= Megger =

British manufacturing company

Megger Group Limited
- Type: Private
- Industry: Electrical power
- Founded: 1889
- Founder: Sydney Evershed; Ernest Vignoles
- Headquarters: Dover (UK); Dallas, Texas; Valley Forge, Pennsylvania; Fort Collins, Colorado (United States), Danderyd (Sweden), Baunach; Radeburg; Aachen (Germany)
- Products: Electrical test and measurement equipment
- Revenue: €250 m
- Number of employees: Approximately 1650 +/-
- Website: www.Megger.com

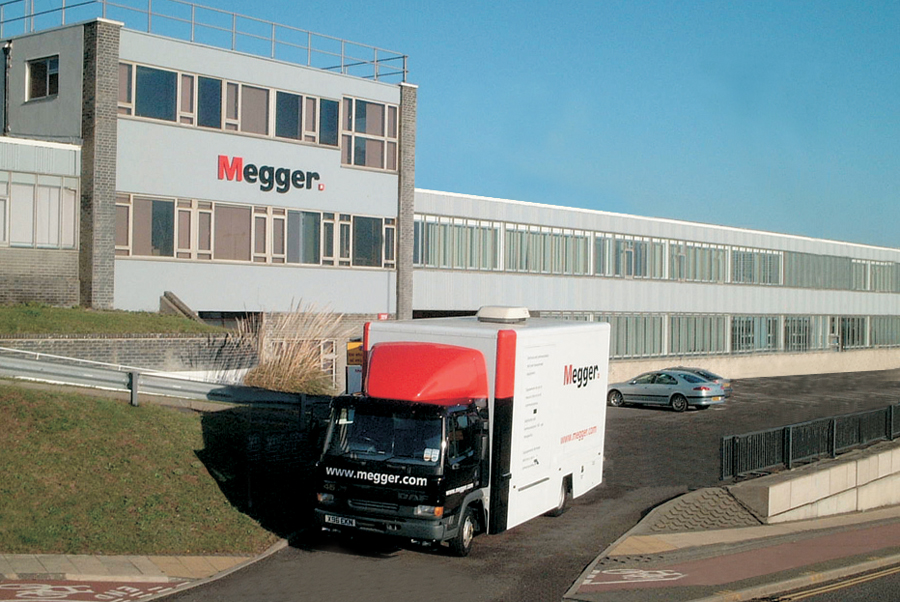
Megger site in Dover, England, UK

Megger Group Limited (also known as Megger) is a British manufacturing company that manufactures electronic test equipment and measuring instruments for electrical power applications.

Megger is known for its electrical insulation testers. It supplies products related to the following areas: cable fault locating, earth/ground testing, low resistance measuring, power quality, electrical wiring, insulation testers, multimeters, portable appliance testers, clamp-on meters, current transformers, etc.

== History ==
Over the years there were several companies whose names were associated with Megger.

=== Evershed & Vignoles ===
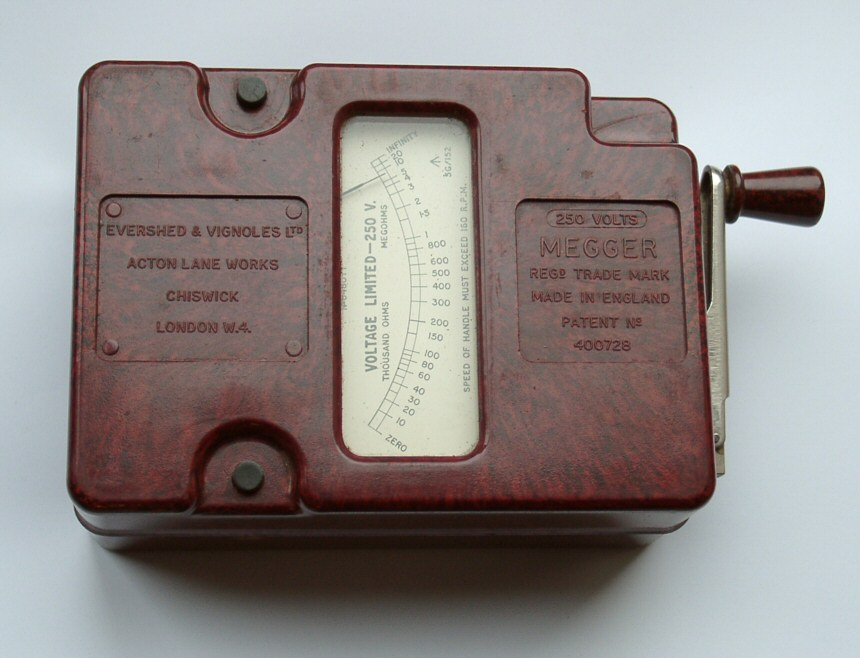
Wee Megger insulation tester

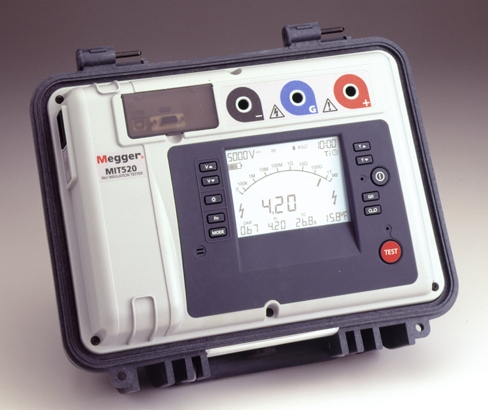
Modern version of Megger insulation tester MIT520/2

Sydney Evershed (1858–1939) and Ernest Vignoles (1865–1948) bought the instrument section of Golden Trotter (where they both worked) and founded Evershed & Vignoles Limited on 5 February 1895. However, it is likely that the origins of Megger can be traced back to 1889. The company was based at Acton Lane Works, Acton Green, London, where it moved from Westbourne Park in 1903.

Sydney Evershed applied for several patents for various electric devices. One of them was for a "hand dynamo", which allowed the generation of voltages high enough to measure resistance in the megohm range and facilitated the construction of the first portable insulation tester. The Megaohm Meter was then named the Megger, and the word became a trademark name, registered on 25 May 1903. The invention became a popular method of insulation testing and, by the 1920s, it was "well-known" by other engineers.

Due to electromagnetic interference, the first Megger insulation testers were built as two separate boxes – one for voltage generation, and one for measurement. They were later integrated into a single device in a Bakelite case, with special foldable handle for driving the dynamo. The most popular was the so-called "Wee Megger" (voltage up to 500 V and resistance up to 20 megohms), but there were larger devices like the "Major Megger", "Meg", or "Megger insulation tester", which could generate up to 2500 V and measure resistance up to 20,000 megohms. The modern version of Megger – model MJ15 – can generate up to 5 kV.

In the 1920s, the company employed approximately 500 people. That number rose to 1,000 during the Second World War, reaching its peak of 1,870 in 1967.

In 1965, Evershed & Vignoles Ltd. became a part of the George Kent Group.

=== H.W. Sullivan Ltd ===
The company (established in 1922) was producing precision laboratory equipment (e.g. resistors, inductors, shunts, galvanometers, etc.). H.W. Sullivan Ltd was incorporated into Megger in 2002.

=== AVO ===
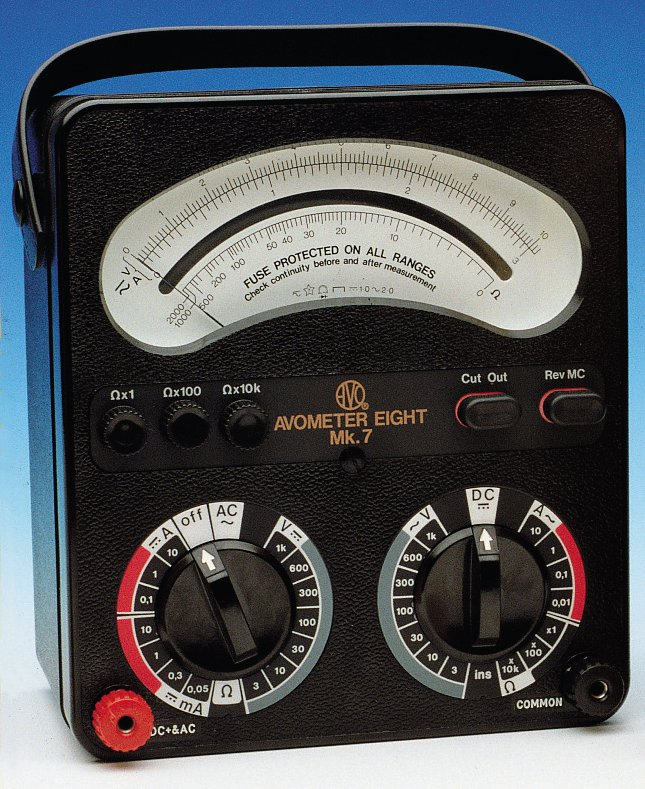
AVOmeter model 8 Mk7

The invention of the first multimeter is attributed to Donald Macadie (1871–1955) who was the manager of the Post Office Telephone Factory in Holloway, North London. He was granted Patent GB 200977 on 26 July 1923. It has often been stated that Mr. MacAdie devised the Avometer because he became dissatisfied with having to carry many separate instruments required for the maintenance of the telecommunication circuits. This story may be based on a paper "The History of the Avometer" by PR P Hawes. However the accuracy of the story may be questioned because it is unlikely that a senior Post Office Engineering manager would have been carrying around his own instruments. Macadie invented a first instrument, which could measure Amps, Volts and Ohms, so the multifunctional meter was then named as AVO. The Automatic Coil Winder and Electrical Equipment Company (ACWEECO,)was formed in 1922, principally by R H Rawlings, to exploit both the Avometer patent and that for an automatic coil winder also designed by MacAdie (GB199417). The first AVO was put on sale in 1923, and although it was initially a DC-only instrument many of its features remained almost unaltered right through to the last Model 8.

ACWEECO later became known as AVO Limited and manufactured instruments with the AVO trademark.

Instruments derived from the original AVO multimeter were manufactured continuously from 1923 until the final model (AVO Model 8 Mk 7) was made in October 2008. Its production was terminated only due to increasing problems with obtaining some mechanical parts for the movement. The AVO Model 8, a 20,000 ohm per volt universal instrument, was introduced in 1951 and versions of this model were extensively used, especially in British industry, education and research, for 57 years without major modifications to the functions it provided.

With the intention of promoting export sales, Avo produced several other types of multimeter (Models 10, 14, 15, 16 and 20/21), which might be considered more modern in design than their traditional types but considered the British market more conservative and, initially at least, these instruments were not offered on the home market. The Model EA113 was an excellent electronic multimeter, sold in the UK and abroad, in the same style as the Model 14 to 21 range.

Avometer model numbers were first used by the company from 1936 (Avometer Model 7) and were used to distinguish designs with different ranges and functionality. Several "Models" were in production contemporaneously. Some designs were produced especially for specific industries (e.g. Model 12 for Auto-electrical work) and at the request of large companies, the British armed forces and later NATO.

The company also designed and made other electronic instruments such as signal generators, valve (vacuum tube) testers and valve characteristic meters and specialist equipment for radio servicing. Many of these were intended for both military and commercial use and were made to a very high standard.

=== AVO Training Institute ===
Logotype of AVO Training Institute

In 1963 Multi-Amp and AVO created Multi-Amp Institute. In 2004 the Institute became AVO Training Institute, Inc. with the headquarters in Dallas, Texas. AVO Training Institute was established for providing training in electrical engineering, particularly regarding safety, maintenance and testing of electrical equipment, also by using instruments from competitive manufacturers.

In 1996 the Institute was certified with ISO 9001 and so far over 230,000 electrical maintenance and testing technicians and engineers from around the world have attended training courses.

The Institute has a Technical Resource Center – an online store offering books, standards, training materials, Personal Protective Equipment, and tools. The actual training can be organised in different sites around the world, for example at the Megger facility in Paris.

The AVO Electrical Engineering Division was created in 2002 and it specialises in power system studies, specifically arc flash hazard analysis.

=== Thorn Electronics/EMI ===
In 1970, along with other members of the George Kent Group the company was acquired by Thorn Electrical Industries founded in 1936. The company was taken over by Thorn EMI in 1967 (linked with company EMI), which at the same time also bought AVO Limited.

In 1987 the name of the company was for the first time changed to Megger Instruments Limited.

== Present times ==
=== Megger ===
Megger Instruments Limited was based at AVO's Dover site, in Archcliffe Road, Dover, CT17 9EN, Kent, England, which is also the present location of the UK branch of the company.

In 1991, the company changed its name to AVO Megger Instruments Limited. In 2000 the company became known as AVO International Holdings Limited and in 2002 as AVO International Limited.

Finally it changed its name to Megger Group Limited in 2002, as it is known today.

The Dover site employs around 230 people. In total (including the sales channels) Megger Group Limited employs around 1500 people worldwide.

=== Biddle ===
For many years, the James G. Biddle Company in Pennsylvania, was the United States importer of Megger products, as well as a manufacturer of equipment under their own name. In 1989, using concepts introduced by Commonwealth Edison Company of Chicago, Biddle started development of a range of equipment to test the integrity of large battery systems, which led to the BITE (Battery Impedance Test Equipment) line of products.

In 1991 Biddle, Megger and MultiAmp joined together to form AVO International. The use of the Biddle trademark was retained for many of products still available today. Biddle was one of the first companies to provide commercial cable fault locators.

=== States ===
Megger Group Ltd. owns the US site in Dallas, Texas. They manufacture terminal blocks and test switches under the trademark States (existing since the 1940s).

=== PowerDB ===
PowerDB was acquired in autumn 2005. They provide "acceptance and maintenance test data management software" which is compatible with many Megger products.

=== Programma ===
Programma Electric AB was a Swedish electrical test and measurement equipment manufacturer founded in 1976. It provided products including: circuit breaker analysers, battery load testers, primary injection testers, vacuum interrupter testers, micrometers and protective relay test instruments. The production plant facility was located in Täby, Sweden.

In March 2001 Programma was sold to GE Energy and joined Megger Group Ltd. in June 2007 as Megger Sweden AB. The company was relocated in April 2013 from Täby to Danderyd.

=== Pax Diagnostics ===
In October 2008 Megger Group Ltd. acquired Pax Diagnostics in Sweden. Pax manufactures transformer testing and insulation diagnostics equipment. Pax Diagnostics was founded in 2004 by former employees of Programma Electric, and it is also based in Täby.

=== SebaKMT ===
Logotype of SebaKMT

In July 2012 Megger acquired SebaKMT specialising in power cable fault location and testing, and pipe leakage detection.

SebaKMT has main development and manufacturing sites in Germany and the USA. This acquisition meant substantial increase of Megger's turnover. As a result, the Group's position on the market of test equipment for the electrical power sector increased significantly.

SebaKMT developed and introduced the arc-reflection method for testing electrical faults in cables.

=== Baker Instrument ===
The business was acquired by Megger from the SKF Group on 19 August 2018. The UK test equipment manufacturer Megger Group has entered into agreement with SKF to purchase its Baker Instrument business which makes equipment for testing and diagnosing electric motors and other rotating machines. The terms of the deal have not been disclosed.

SKF acquired Baker for $14m in 2007. At that time, the Colorado-based business employed 62 people and had annual sales of around $11m. SKF said that the move into motor diagnostics was important to its energy efficiency business, and was in line with its move to support its customers sustainability efforts.

In 2018, SKF sold the Baker factory to the world leader Megger. This was a leverage to the Baker factory who are still the leaders on the market. There are many companies trying to copy their software for Surge test diagnostic, but they failed their tests.

In an interview with Drives & Controls Magazine, Megger's CEO Jim Fairbairn, shares his thoughts: “We are excited to acquire a recognized industry leader with equipment and online testing capability that will complement Megger’s product range. We look forward to working with the Baker team to drive continued growth and innovation.”

=== Sentrisense ===
In July 2025, Megger Group Limited acquired Sentrisense, an Argentinian technology company specializing in real-time monitoring solutions for overhead power lines.

Founded by engineers with deep expertise in embedded devices, Sentrisense developed SENTRI, a lightweight, field device that combines Dynamic Line Rating (DLR), Asset Health Monitoring (AHM), and cable theft detection into a single autonomous sensor. SENTRI is deployed by utilities across Europe, North America, and Latin America to monitor sag, vibration, temperature, and tilt on both energized and de-energized lines. It transmits live data via cellular networks and is fully self-managed from the cloud-based platform SENSE.

By joining Megger’s portfolio, Sentrisense brings an edge to grid modernization efforts worldwide, aligning with regulations such as FERC Order 881 in the U.S. and supporting utilities in increasing line capacity, extending asset life, and enhancing reliability through sensor-based, real-time visibility.

== Intellectual property ==
=== Trademarks ===
The first trademark of the company, the name Megger was registered in 1903 and it remains the intellectual property of the Megger Ltd.

Most of the names and trademarks of the acquired companies are now owned by Megger Group Ltd. Apart from "Megger" itself, the best known ones are: AVO, Biddle, Biddle AVO, Biddle Megger, States, PowerDB, and recently Programma and Pax Diagnostics.

However, some of the names of the products are also protected: Megger, AVO, DLRO, MFT, MIT, MPRT, etc.

The Group publishes a copyrighted but distributed for free quarterly magazine titled "Electrical tester" aimed at electrical engineers who might use products from the Megger range.

=== Patents ===
It is difficult to assess the actual number of patents, because some of them were obtained before acquired companies joined Megger Group. The original Megger insulation tester patent is over 100 years old.

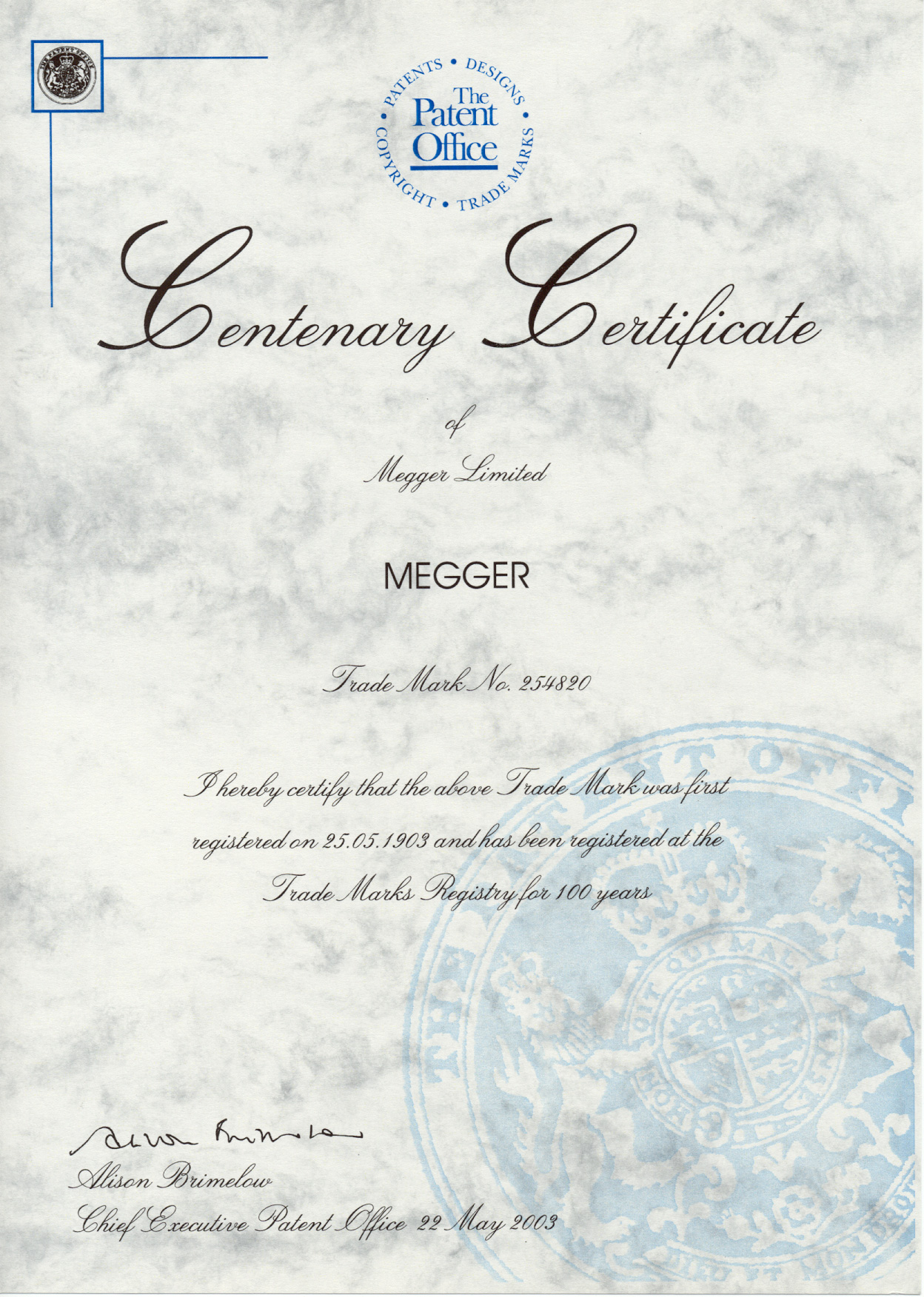
Centenary certificate of Megger trademark

The table shows a timeline of some typical devices introduced by Megger Group companies (not necessarily covered with patents). In recent years the company has also paid more attention to the ergonomics and design of their products.

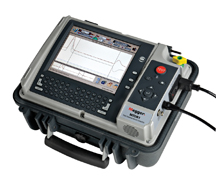
Megger's time-domain reflectometer MTDR1

| Year | Device |
|---|---|
| 1889 | Portable insulation tester (Megger) |
| 1908 | Low resistance Ohmmeter (LRO) |
| 1923 | Multimeter with Amps, Volts and Ohms (AVO) |
| 1928 | Multistation watt-hour meter test board |
| 1942 | Resistive load box |
| 1950 | Cable fault locator |
| 1951 | Protective relay test set |
| 1953 | Partial discharge (Corona) detection system |
| 1968 | Portable digital multimeter |
| 1979 | Digital line earth loop impedance tester |
| 1985 | Microprocessor-based high current test set |
| 1989 | Battery impedance test equipment (BITE) |
| 1990 | Automatic 10kV insulation power factor test set |
| 1990 | Microprocessor-based protective relay test set |
| 1994 | DSP-driven watthour meter test set |
| 1996 | Windows-based Testing Software Program |
| 1999 | Time-domain reflectometer with TX Null technology (TDR) |
| 2000 | Micro-weight Low Resistance Ohmmeter (DLRO) |
| 2003 | High power Relay test set with user features |
| 2003 | Multi-function tester with ergonomic design |
| 2005 | Noise immune 10kV insulation tester |
| 2007 | Loop impedance in an RCCB electrical test circuit tester |
| 2009 | Three-phase transformer turns ratio test sets (TTR) |
| 2010 | Transformer ohmmeter (MTO) |
| 2010 | Cable fault location system (PFL) |
| 2011 | Automatic 12kV insulation power/dissipation factor test set (DELTA) |

== Awards ==
In 2011 Megger's MFT1700 Multifunction Tester won the "Innovative Test & Measurement Product of the Year", at the Electrical Industry Awards. Three other products were also nominated: hand-held micro-ohmmeter MOM2 (category Innovative Power Product of the Year), professional portable appliance tester PAT400 (Innovative Test & Measurement Product of the Year), and digital earth clamps DET14C / DET24C (Innovative Commercial/Industrial Product of the Year).

Megger also won in earlier editions, for instance in 2007 these were: multifunction tester MFT 1553 and portable cable fault location PFL40.

In 2012 Megger won an award for its TDR1000/3 time-domain reflectometer.

== Products ==
=== Manufacturing ===
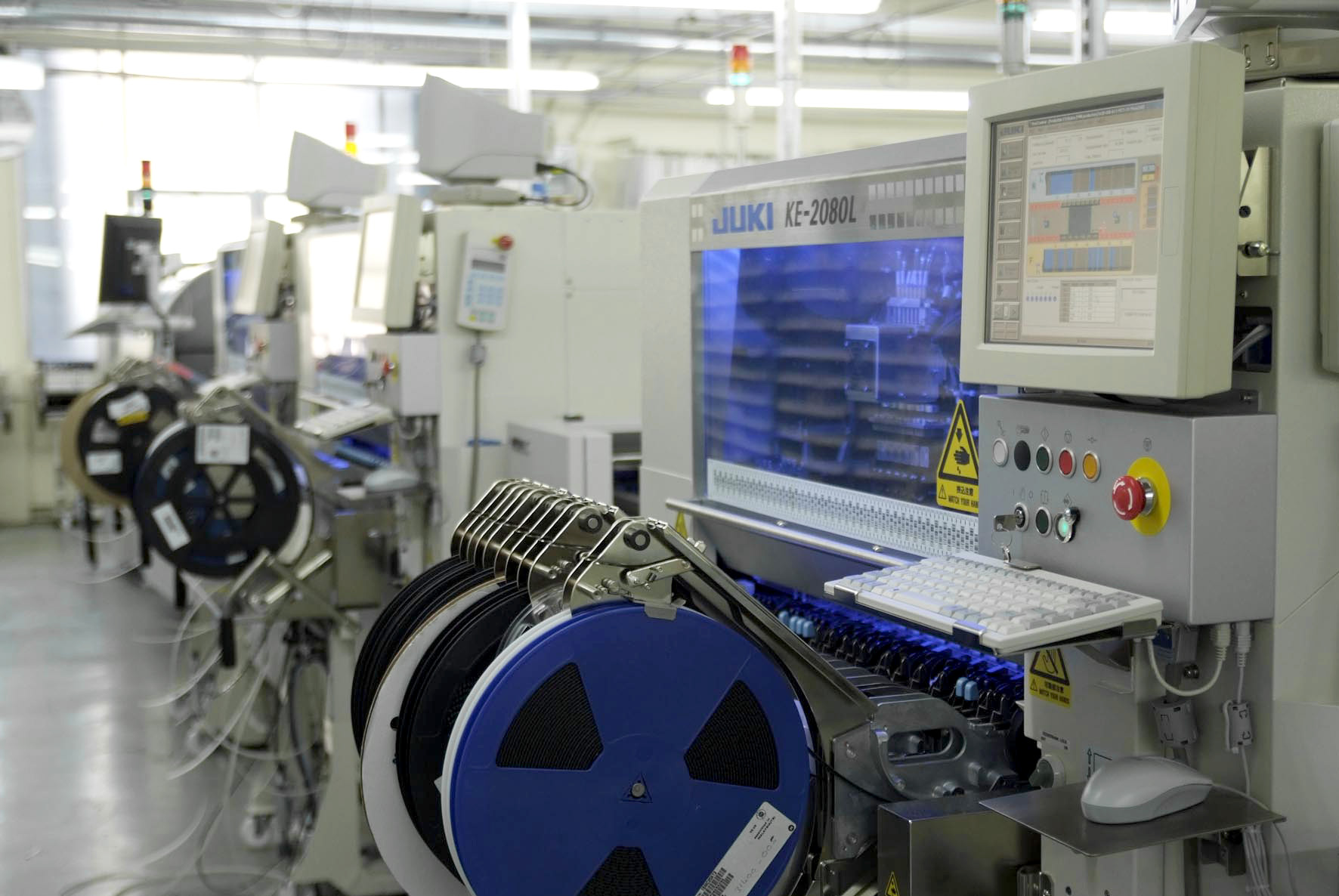
SMD machines at Dover site

Megger Group has manufacturing sites and sales centres in several countries worldwide. The main production sites are in: Dover, Dallas, Valley Forge and Danderyd.

Certificates of Conformity are supplied with most instruments. Depending on product and site the metrology can be traceable to:

- ANSI/NCSL Z540-1
- Nuclear 10CFR Appendix B PART 21
- NIST
- MIL STD 45662-A
- ISO 10012
- ISO 17025
- National Physical Laboratory

Dover site has its own EMC laboratory and SMD machines. However, many of the mechanical parts are purchased from other suppliers. (This was one of the factors why production of AVO Model 8 was discontinued.)

All manufacturing sites have ISO 9001:2000 and Dover and Danderyd sites are certified to ISO 14001.

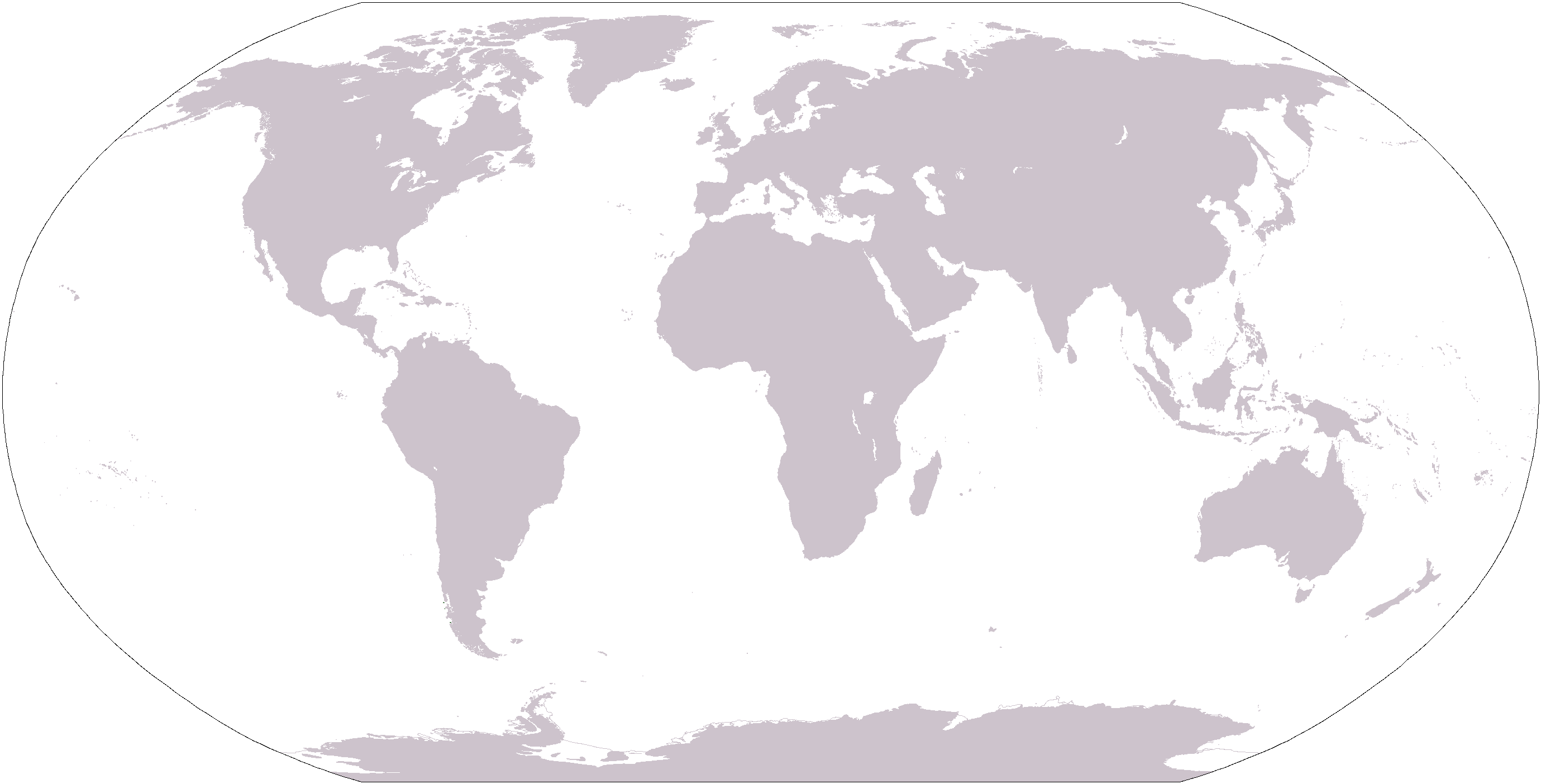

=== Sales and technical support ===
The Group has over 1000 distribution points in 132 countries. 85% of sales are made via the distribution network. There are sales centres in several countries and products are also sold via specialised distributors including RS Components and more recently Test Equipment Connection Corporation.

There are total of 15 sales and technical support offices in the US, Canada, Dover, Paris, Mumbai, Sydney, and Bahrain.

=== Types of products ===
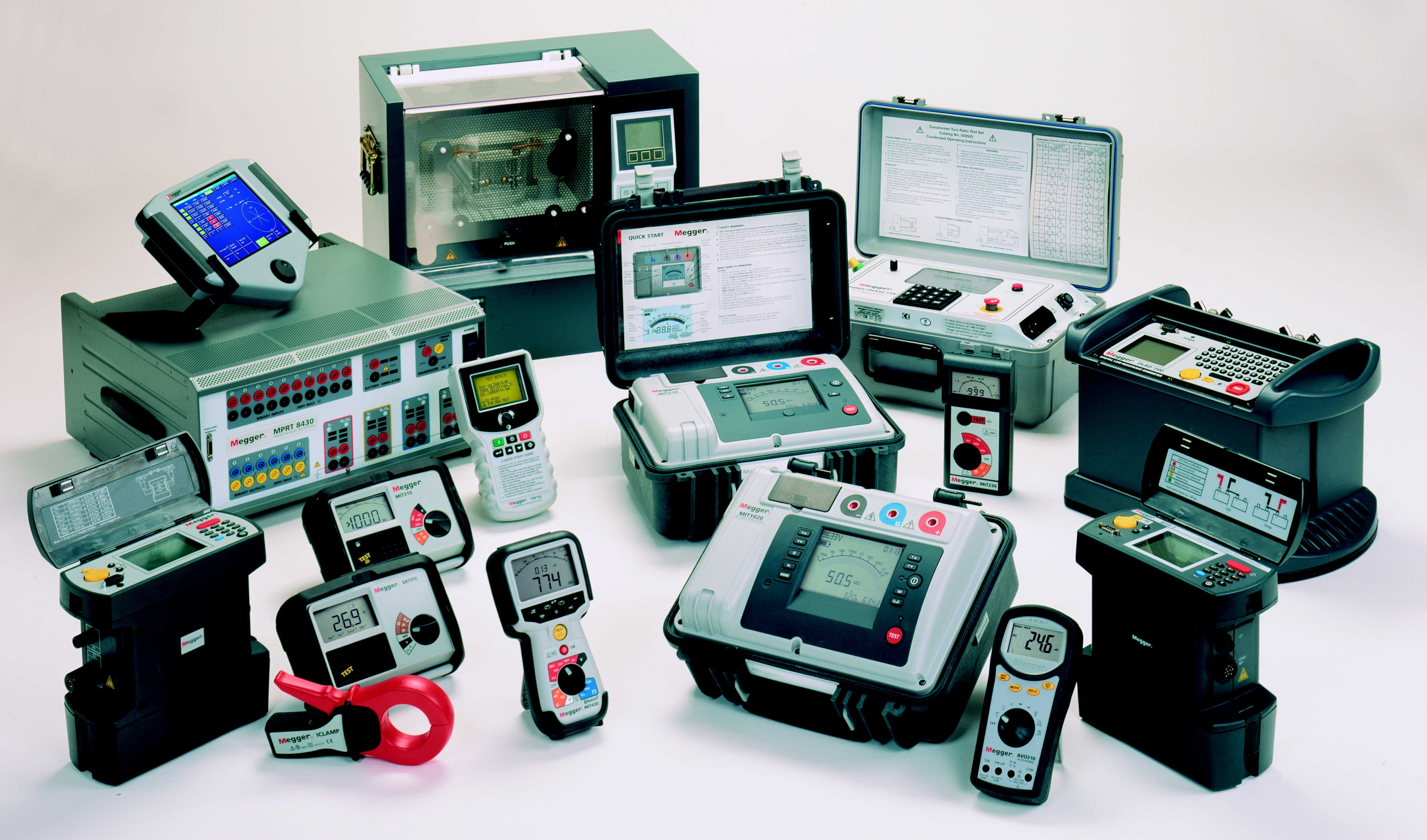
Megger product range (Dover site)

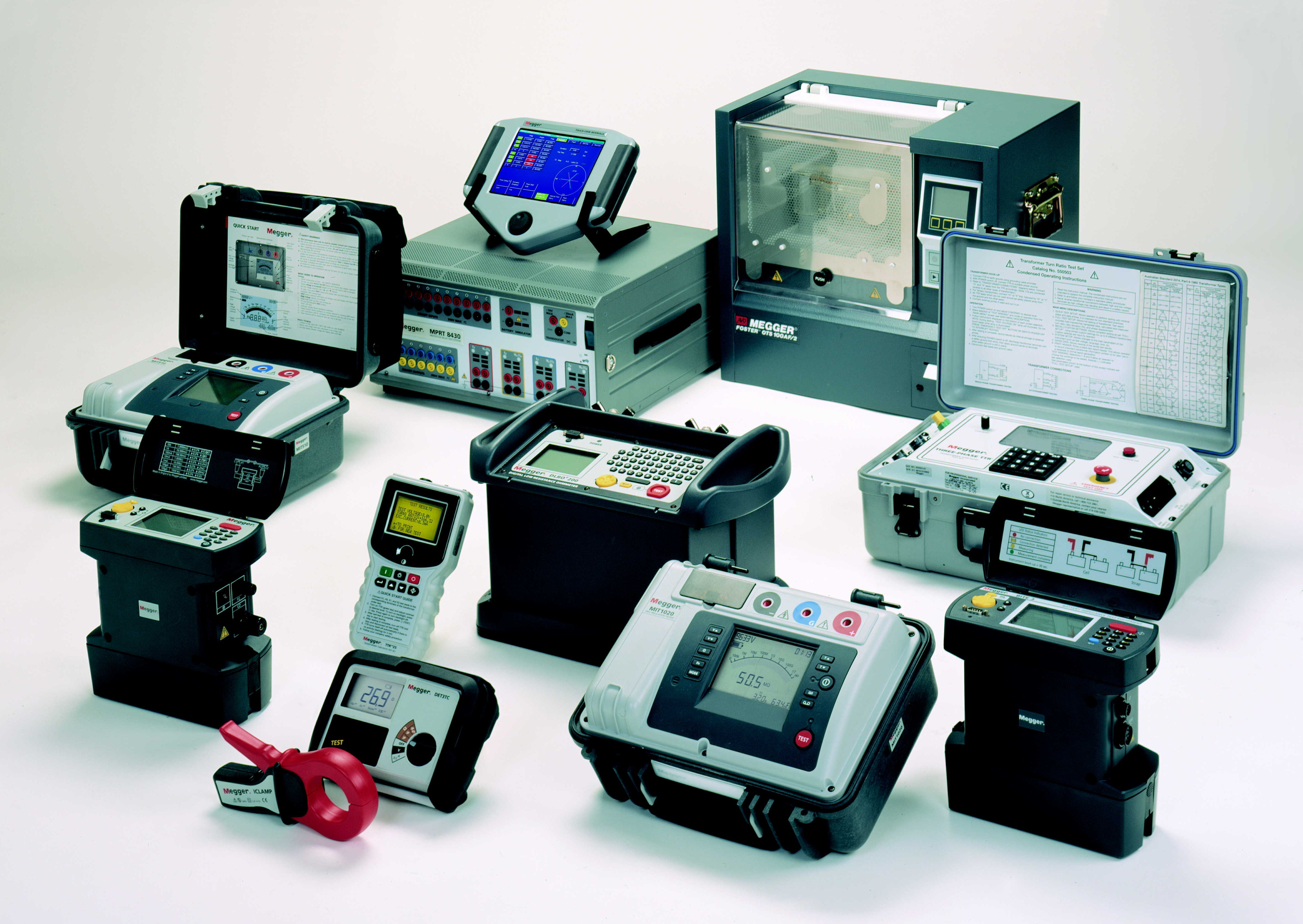
Megger "power" products

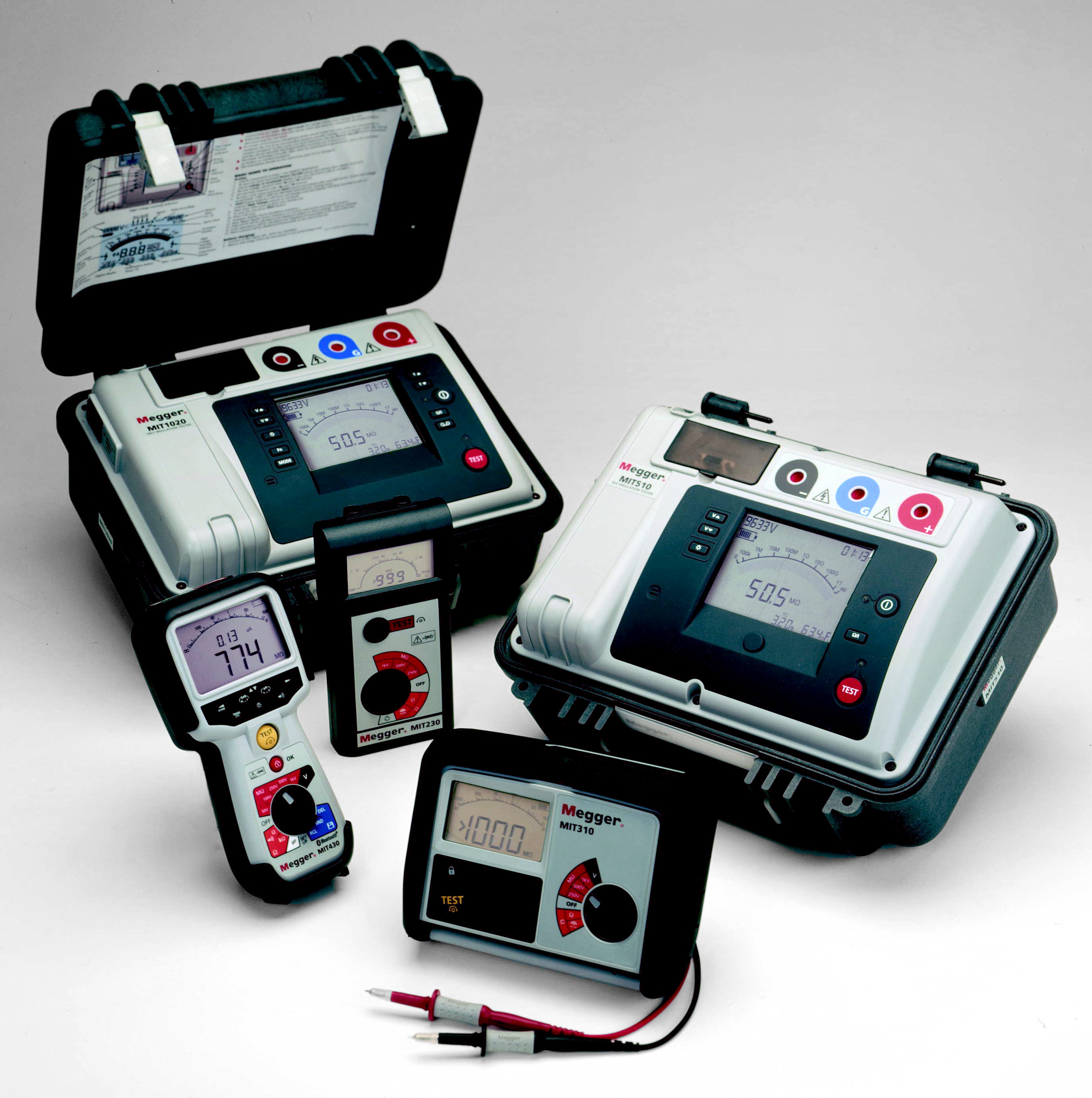
Megger insulation testers

Megger produces over 1000 products in around 25 groups:

1. Battery test equipment
2. Cable fault locating equipment
3. Circuit breaker testers
4. Data communication testers
5. Fiber optic testers
6. Ground resistance testers
7. Insulation power factor testers
8. Insulation resistance testers
9. Line testing equipment
10. Low resistance ohmmeters
11. Motor and phase rotation testers
12. Multimeters
13. Oil testers
14. Partial discharge test equipment
15. Portable appliance and tool testers
16. Power quality instruments
17. Recloser test equipment
18. Relay testers
19. T1 network testers
20. Tachometers and speed measurement instruments
21. Time domain reflectometry testers
22. Transmission impairment testers
23. Watt-hour meter tester
24. States terminal block and test switches
25. Professional hands-on technical and safety training programs

The equipment is roughly divided into three groups: Power, Building and Wiring, and Telecommunications.

== Research ==
In the UK, Megger regularly sponsors first year projects at the University of Kent, as well as collaborating with other universities.

== Charity ==
Megger donated 5% of its Chinese sales revenue (for three months) to the local Red Cross after the 2008 Sichuan earthquake. This was also preceded with 15% reduction on all their equipment sold in China immediately after the earthquake.

Over $9,000 of electrical testing equipment has been donated to Mesalands Community College's North American Wind Research and Training Center (NAWRTC).
