= TDR moisture sensor =

A spatial TDR moisture sensor employs time-domain reflectometry (TDR) to measure moisture content indirectly based on the correlation to electric and dielectric properties of materials, such as soil, agrarian products, snow, wood or concrete.

Measurement usually involves inserting a sensor into the substance to be tested and then applying either Standard Waveform Analysis to determine the average moisture content along the sensor or Profile Analysis to provide moisture content at discrete points along the sensor. A spatial location can be achieved by appropriate installation of several sensors.

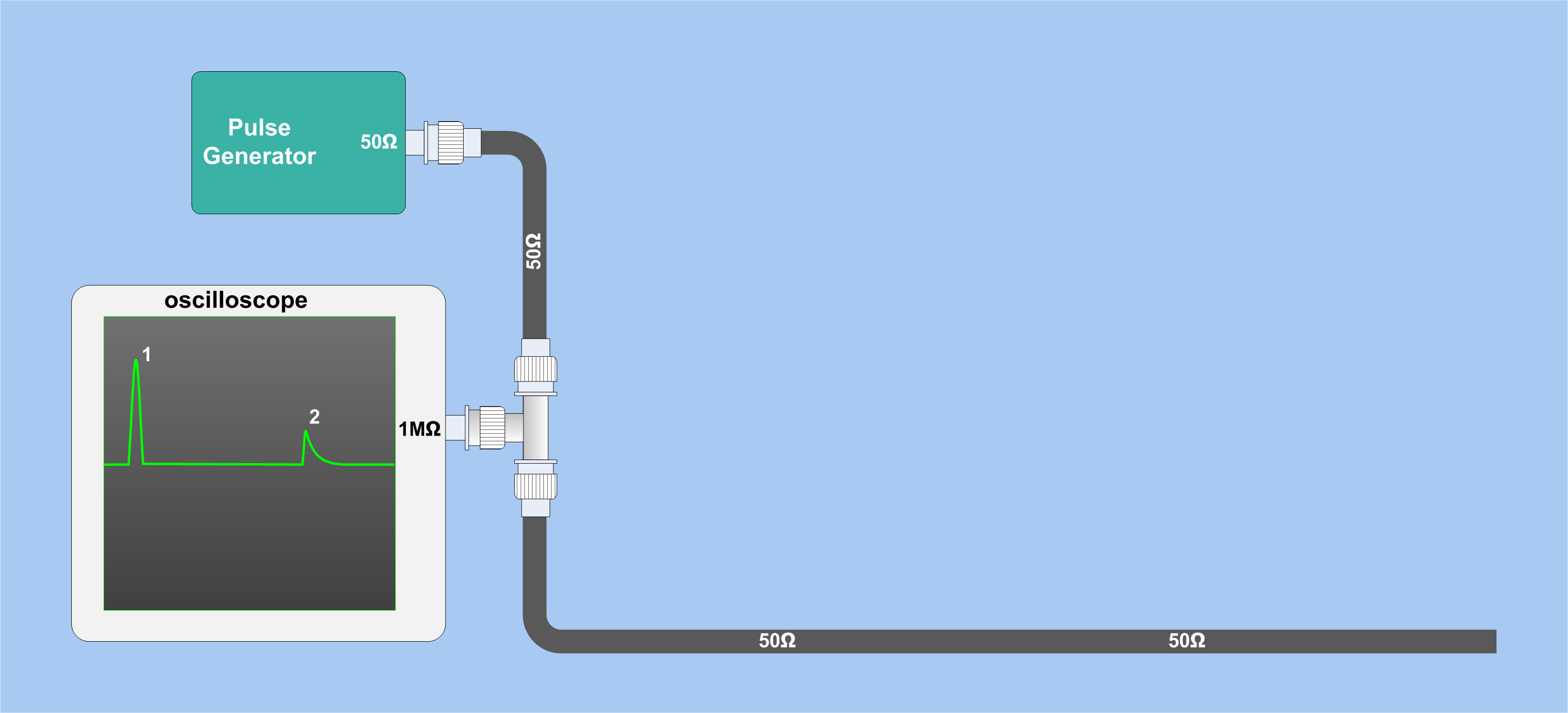
Functional principle of a TDR meter

== Standard waveform analysis ==
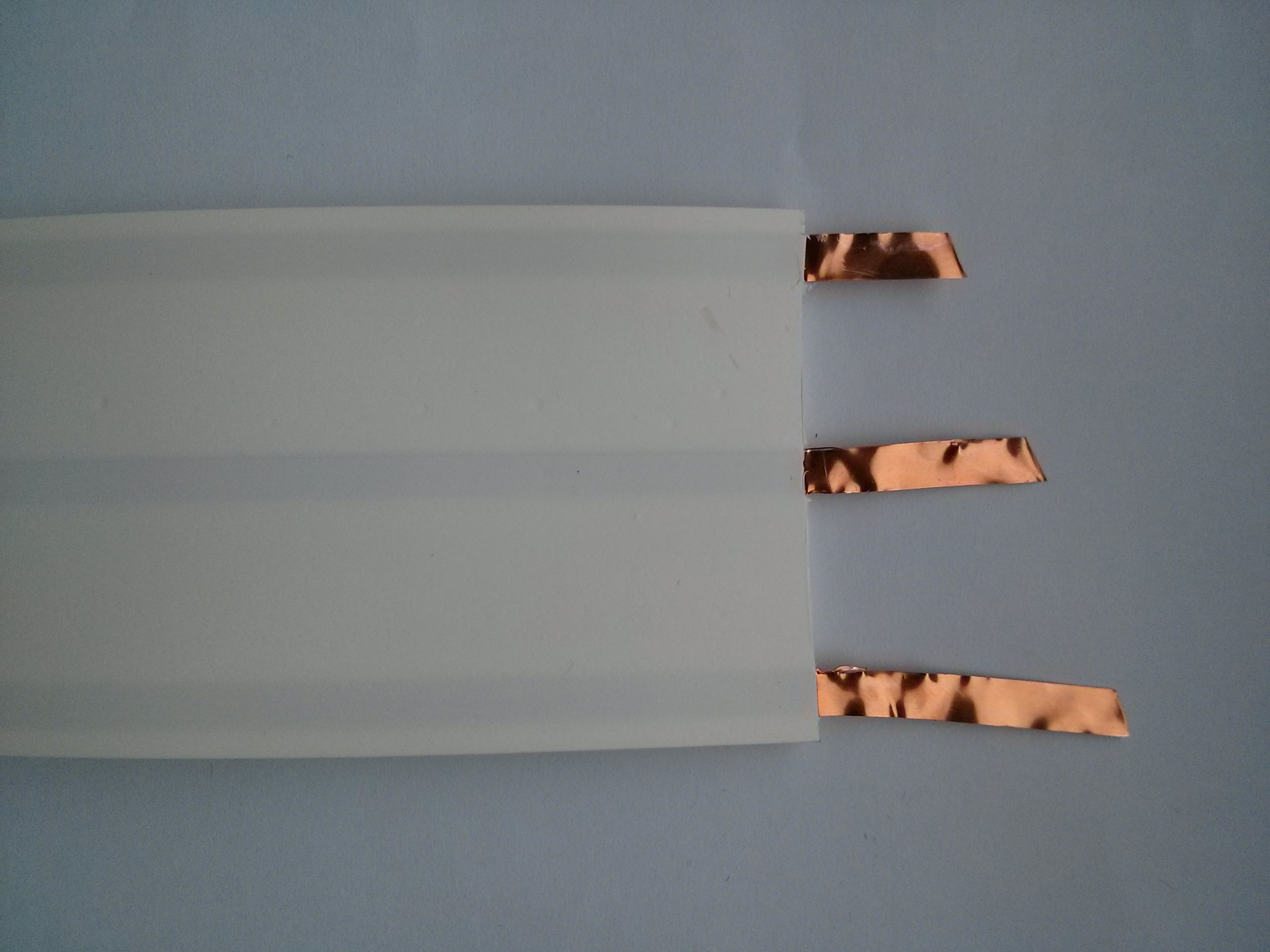
A TDR waveguide with exposed wires

In the waveform analysis a sensor (usually a probe) is placed in the material to be tested. The sensor contains a waveguide consisting of two, three, or more parallel wires which is connected via a coaxial cable to a voltage pulse generator which sends precisely defined voltage pulses into the sensor. As the pulse travels along the waveguide its progress varies depending on the moisture content of the material being examined. When the pulse reaches the end of the waveguide it is reflected. This reflection is visualised in a TDR waveform using an oscilloscope connected to the sensor. The rate of travel of the pulse in the probe is measured and related to moisture content, with slower travel indicating an increase of moisture. By measuring the time from the initial pulse until the reflection is received the average moisture content and relative Permittivity of the sample can be calculated by using an equivalent circuit as a reference.

Standard waveform analysis can be used either manually (hand held instruments) or automatically for monitoring moisture content in several areas such as hydrology, agriculture and construction.

== Profile analysis ==
Standard Waveform Analysis is unable to provide a spatial moisture profile. More sophisticated methods such as Profile Analysis are required. This method uses a variety of techniques to add spatial information to the measurement results.

- Reconstruction algorithm: One approach is to model the pulse propagation in the waveguide and calibrate the model against laboratory measurement. By comparing real sample measurements to the model, the moisture distribution can be inferred.

The usefulness of this method is limited by the complexity of the algorithms, the limited amplitude resolution and interference in the TDR equipment.

- Alteration of Cross Section: Altering the cross section of the waveguide alters the pulse reflections and creates artificial reflections at each alteration of the cross section. This enables segmentations of the waveguide by applying a different cross section to each segment.

However the difficulty of distinguishing the artificial pulse reflection from a real variance prevents the use of this technique for automated data analysis.

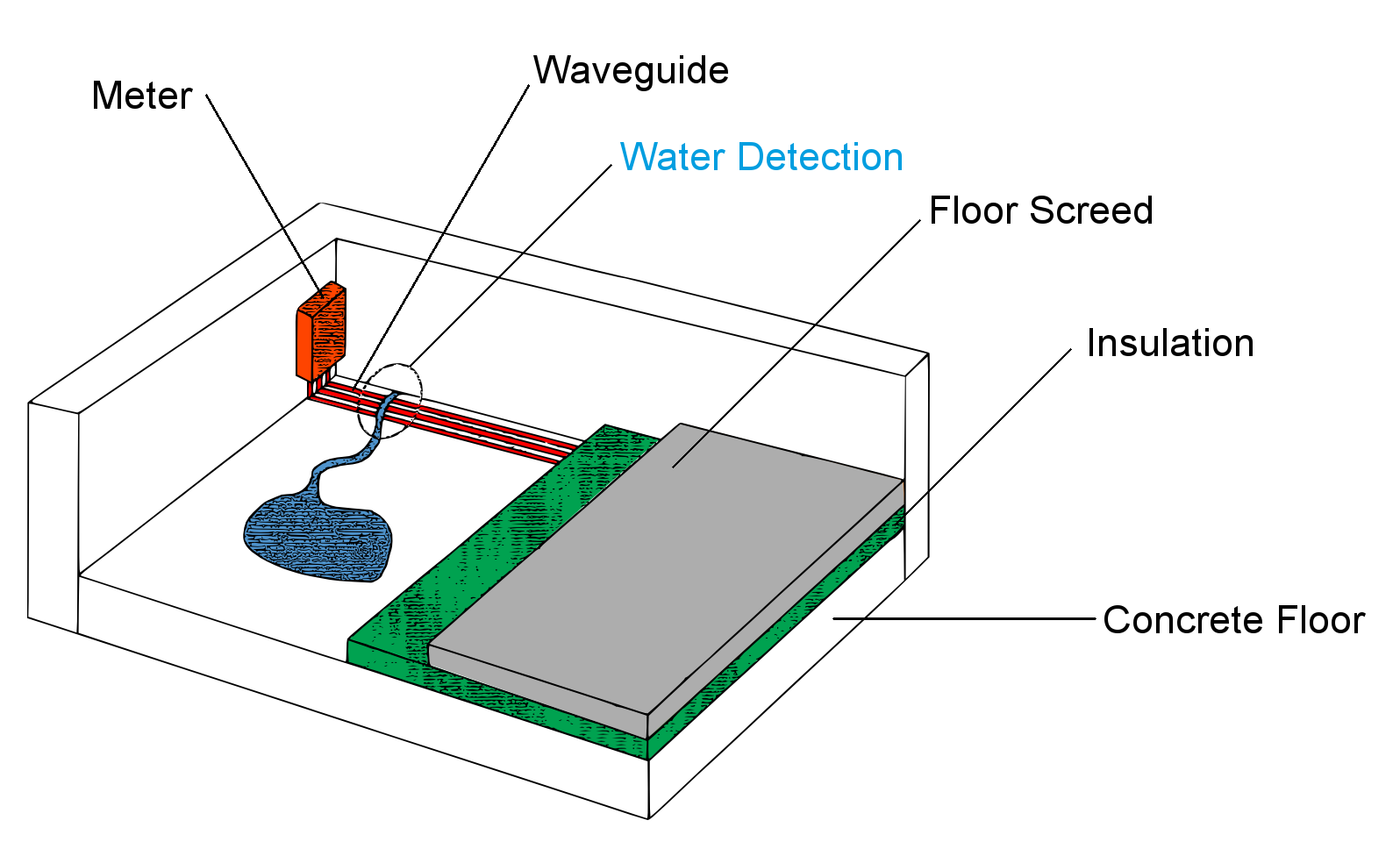
Moisture detection in buildings using profile analysis

- Subdivision: The waveguide is subdivided into segments by using PIN diodes. Each segment provides its own pulse reflection thus showing the moisture content in that segment alone. This enables the moisture content to be mapped to the individual segments and therefore shows the spatial moisture distribution.

As the length of the waveguide increases the reflections become weaker and eventually disappear. This limits the use of this method as do the influence of the diode circuit on the signal and manufacturing costs associated with the complexity of the waveguide compared to other methods.

- Length Variation: This method uses several waveguides with different lengths mounted parallel to each other. As a separate waveguide must be connected for each area, the costs of this method are very high.

Profile analysis allows fully automatic measurement and monitoring of spatial moisture content and thus a leak monitoring of building foundations, landfill barriers and geological repositories in salt mines.

== See also ==
- Time-domain reflectometer
- Transmission line
