= Hybrid balance =

Telecommunications specification

In telecommunications, a hybrid balance is an expression of the degree of electrical symmetry between two impedances connected to two conjugate sides of a hybrid coil or resistance hybrid. It is usually expressed in dB.

If the respective impedances of the branches of the hybrid that are connected to the conjugate sides of the hybrid are known, hybrid balance may be computed by the formula for return loss.
