= Frequency domain sensor =

Soil moisture content measuring instrument

Frequency domain (FD) sensor is an instrument developed for measuring soil moisture content. The instrument has an oscillating circuit, the sensing part of the sensor is embedded in the soil, and the operating frequency will depend on the value of soil's dielectric constant.

== Types of sensors ==
- Capacitance probe, or fringe capacitance sensor. Capacitance probes use capacitance to measure the dielectric permittivity of the soil. The volume of water in the total volume of soil most heavily influences the dielectric permittivity of the soil because the dielectric constant of water (80) is much greater than the other constituents of the soil (mineral soil: 4, organic matter: 4, air: 1). Thus, when the amount of water changes in the soil, the probe will measure a change in capacitance (from the change in dielectric permittivity) that can be directly correlated with a change in water content. Circuitry inside some commercial probes changes the capacitance measurement into a proportional millivolt output. Other configurations are like the neutron probe where an access tube made of PVC is installed in the soil. The probe consists of a sensing head at a fixed depth. The sensing head consists of an oscillator circuit, the frequency is determined by an annular electrode, fringe-effect capacitor, and the dielectric constant of the soil.
- Electrical impedance sensor consists of soil probes and uses electrical impedance measurement. The most common configuration is based on the standing wave principle (Gaskin & Miller, 1996). The device comprises a 100 MHz sinusoidal oscillator, a fixed impedance coaxial transmission line, and probe wires which are buried in the soil. The oscillator signal is propagated along the transmission line into the soil probe, and if the probe's impedance differs from that of the transmission line, a proportion of the incident signal is reflected along the line towards the signal source.

== Benefits and limitations ==
Compared to time domain reflectometer (TDR), FD sensors are cheaper to build and have a faster response time. However, because of the complex electrical field around the probe, the sensor needs to be calibrated for different soil types. Some commercial sensors have been able to remove the soil type sensitivity by using a high frequency.
