= Megohmmeter =

Ohmmeter used to measure the electrical resistance of insulators

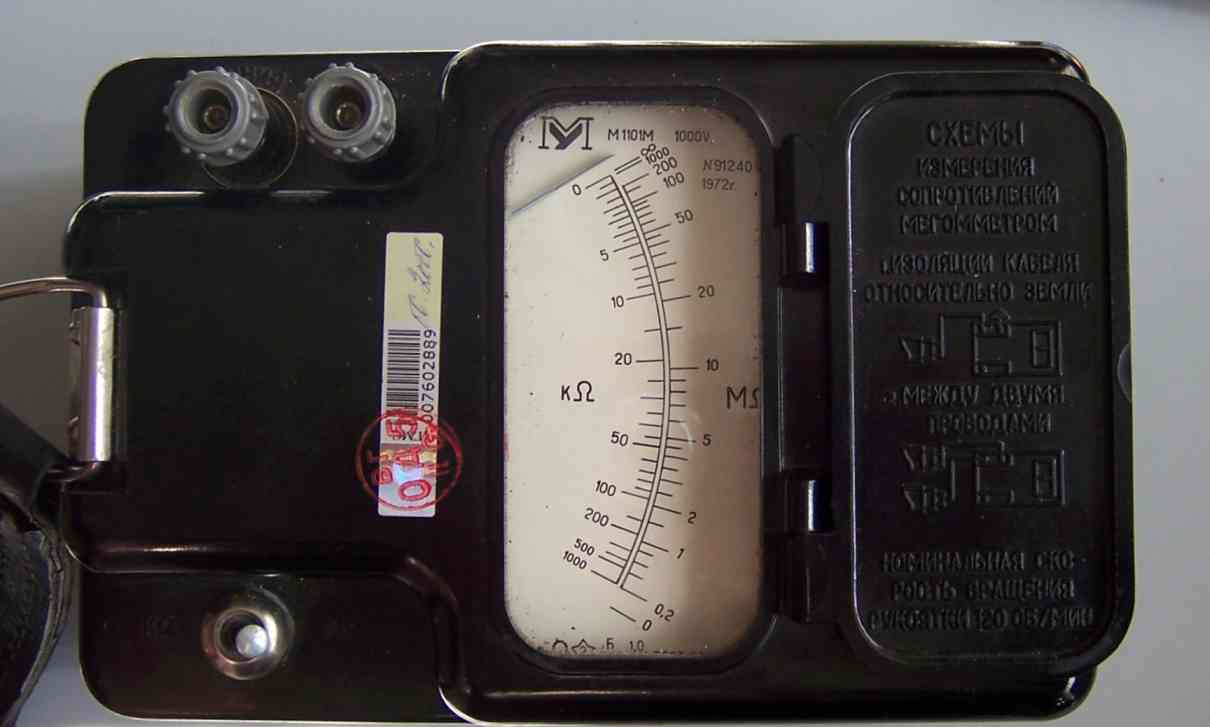
Megohmmeter M1101M.

A megohmmeter or insulation resistance tester, is a special type of ohmmeter used to measure the electrical resistance of insulators. Insulating components, for example cable jackets, must be tested for their insulation strength at the time of commissioning and as part of maintenance of high voltage electrical equipment and installations.

For this purpose, megohmmeters, which can provide high DC voltages (typically in ranges from 500 V to 5 kV, some are up to 15 kV) at specified current capacity, are used. Acceptable insulator resistance values are typically 1 to 10 megohms, depending on the standards referenced.

== Operation ==
Resistance to be measured is connected across the terminals i.e. connected in series with the deflecting coil and across the generator. When the current is supplied to the coils then they have torque in opposite directions.

If resistance to be measured is high, no current will flow through the deflecting coil, the controlling coil, will, therefore, set itself perpendicular to the magnetic axis and hence set the pointer to the infinity.

If the resistance to be measured is small, high current flow through the deflecting coil and the resulting torque sets the pointer to zero.

For the intermediate value of resistance, depending upon the torque production, the pointer is set at a point between zero and infinity.

The hand-driven generator is of the permanent magnet type and it is designed to generate from 500 to 2500 volts. Testing voltage is produced by the rotation of the crank in a hand-operated megger, or by the battery in the case of an electronic-type megger. For testing a range up to 440V, equipment requires 550V DC is sufficient. The current coil or deflecting coil is series-connected and allows the electric current to flow through the circuit being tested.

Control and deflecting coil has a current limiting resistor connected in series so as to protect the external circuit in case of damages caused due to very low resistance. Testing voltage is produced by electromagnetic induction in case of hand-operated megger and by a battery in case of electronic type megger. The deflection of pointer increases with the increases in voltage in the external circuit and also decreases with the increase in current. That is, resultant torque is inversely related to current and directly related to voltage. While the electrical circuit that is being tested is open, the resultant torque caused due to voltage coil is maximum and the deflection pointer shows the value of ‘infinity’ which means the circuit does not have any shorting present and resistance is the maximum within the circuit being tested. In the case of a short circuit, the deflection pointer shows ‘zero’ which indicates ‘no’ resistance in the circuit being tested.

A megger consists of an EMF source and voltmeter. The scale of the voltmeter is calibrated in ohms (kilo-ohms or megohms, as the case may be). In measurements, the EMF of the self-contained source must be equal to that of the source used in calibration.

== See also ==
- Dielectric withstand test – Test to ensure electrical insulators work under required conditions
- Megger – British manufacturing company
