= Attenuation distortion =

Non-flat frequency response

Attenuation distortion is the distortion of an analog signal that occurs during transmission when the transmission medium does not have a flat frequency response across the bandwidth of the medium or the frequency spectrum of the signal.

Attenuation distortion occurs when some frequencies are attenuated more than other frequencies. When an analog signal of constant amplitude across its frequency spectrum suffers attenuation distortion, some frequencies of the received signal arrive being greater in amplitude (louder), relative to other frequencies.

To overcome the effects of attenuation distortion, communications circuits have special equalization equipment attached at the ends of the circuit or in between, designed to attenuate the signal evenly across the frequency spectrum, or to allow the signal to be received at equal amplitude for all frequencies. Attenuation distortion can still occur in a properly equipped circuit if this equalization filter is not properly maintained or adjusted.

In DSL circuits, echoes due to impedance mismatch often cause attenuation distortion so severe that some frequencies must be automatically mapped out and not used.
