= Spread-spectrum time-domain reflectometry =

Spread-spectrum time-domain reflectometry (SSTDR) is a measurement technique to identify faults, usually in electrical wires, by observing reflected spread spectrum signals. This type of time-domain reflectometry can be used in various high-noise and live environments. Additionally, SSTDR systems have the additional benefit of being able to precisely locate the position of the fault. Specifically, SSTDR is accurate to within a few centimeters for wires carrying 400 Hz aircraft signals as well as MIL-STD-1553 data bus signals. An SSTDR system can be run on a live wire because the spread spectrum signals can be isolated from the system noise and activity.

At the most basic level, the system works by sending spread spectrum signals down a wireline and waiting for those signals to be reflected back to the SSTDR system. The reflected signal is then correlated with a copy of the sent signal. Mathematical algorithms are applied to both the shape and timing of the signals to locate either the short or the end of an open circuit.

== Detecting intermittent faults in live wires ==
Spread-spectrum time domain reflectometry is used in detecting intermittent faults in live wires. From buildings and homes to aircraft and naval ships, this technology can discover irregular shorts on live wire running 400 Hz, 115 V. For accurate location of a wiring system's fault the SSTDR associates the PN code with the signal on the line then stores the exact location of the correlation before the arc dissipates. Present SSTDR can collect a complete data set in under 5 ms.

SSTDR technology allows for analysis of a network of wires. One SSTDR sensor can measure up to 4 junctions in a branched wire system.

== See also ==
- Spread spectrum
- Time-domain reflectometry
