= Insertion loss =

Loss of signal transmission power when devices are connected to a transmission line

In telecommunications, insertion loss is the loss of signal power resulting from the insertion of a device in a transmission line or optical fiber and is usually expressed in decibels (dB).

If the power transmitted to the load before insertion is P_{T} and the power received by the load after insertion is P_{R}, then the insertion loss in decibels is given by,

$$IL(\mathrm{dB}) = 10 \log_{10} {P_\mathrm T \over P_\mathrm R}$$

== Electronic filters ==
Insertion loss is a figure of merit for an electronic filter and this data is generally specified with a filter. Insertion loss is defined as a ratio of the signal level in a test configuration without the filter installed ($\left\vert V_1 \right\vert$) to the signal level with the filter installed ($\left\vert V_2 \right\vert$). This ratio is described in decibels by the following equation:

$$\mbox{Insertion loss (dB)} = 10 \log_{10} {\frac{ \left\vert V_1 \right\vert ^2 }{ \left\vert V_2 \right\vert ^2 }} = 20 \log_{10} { \frac{\left\vert V_1 \right\vert}{\left\vert V_2 \right\vert}}$$

For passive filters, $\left\vert V_2 \right\vert$ will be smaller than $\left\vert V_1 \right\vert$. In this case, the insertion loss is positive and measures how much smaller the signal is after adding the filter.

== Link with scattering parameters ==
In case the two measurement ports use the same reference impedance, the insertion loss ($IL$) is defined as:

$$IL = -20\log_{10}\left|S_{21}\right| \,\text{dB}$$.

Here $S_{21}$ is one of the scattering parameters. Insertion loss is the extra loss produced by the introduction of the DUT between the 2 reference planes of the measurement. The extra loss can be introduced by intrinsic loss in the DUT and/or mismatch. In case of extra loss the insertion loss is defined to be positive.

== See also ==
- Mismatch loss
- Return loss
