= Murray loop bridge =

Murray loop bridge

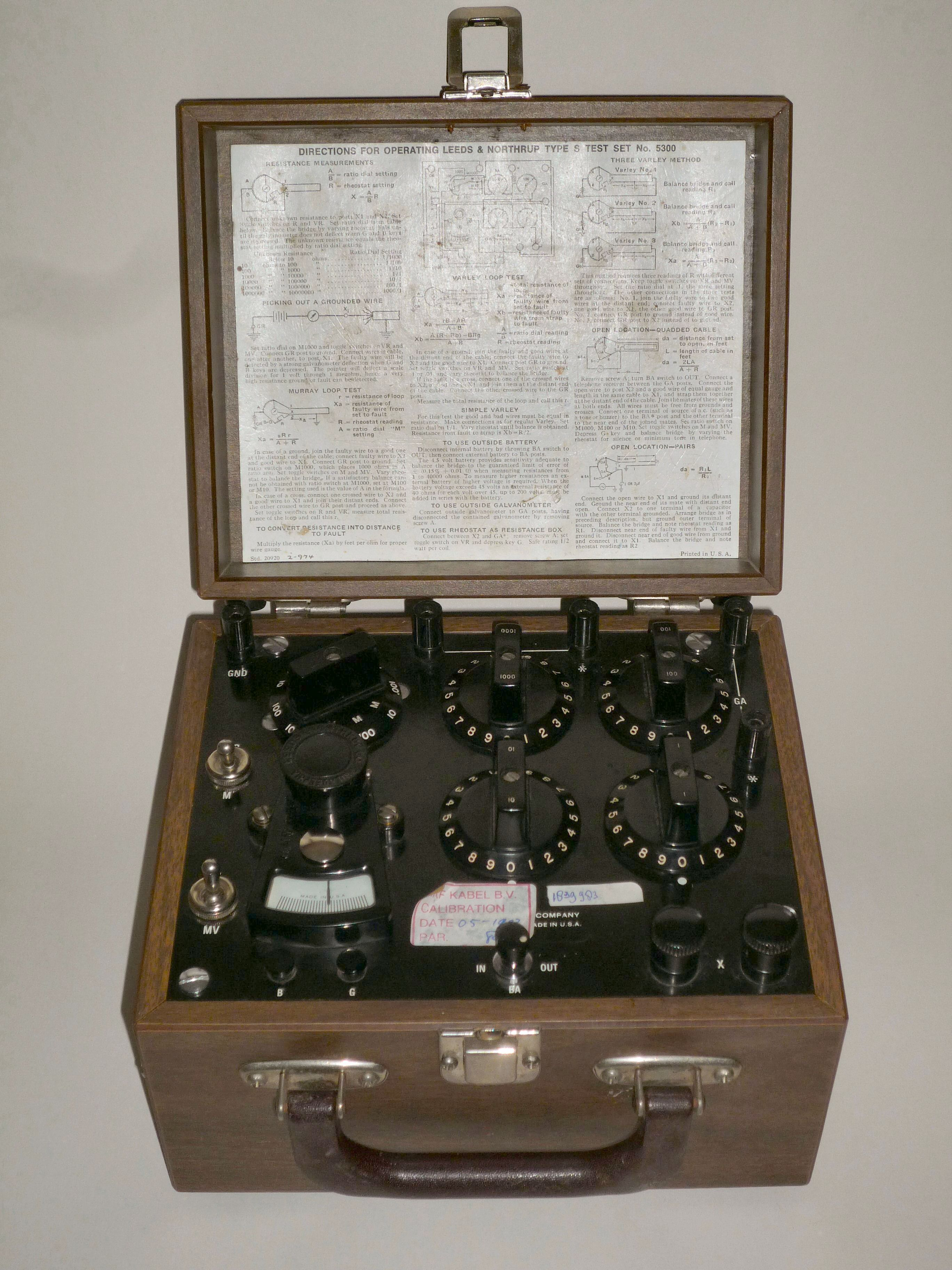
Leeds & Northrup test instrument capable of performing Murray and Varley loop tests.

The Murray loop bridge is a bridge circuit used for locating faults in underground or underwater cables. It has been used for more than 100 years but is being replaced by the more precise time-domain reflectometer.

One end of the faulted cable is connected through a pair of resistors to the voltage source. Also a null detector is connected. The other end of the cable is shorted. The bridge is brought to balance by changing the values of R_{B1} and R_{B2}, which is achieved when:

$\frac{R_x}{R_g + R_y} = \frac{R_{B1}}{R_{B2}}$

which is equivalent to:

$R_x = (R_g + R_y) \cdot \frac{R_{B1}}{R_{B2}}$

The value of resistance R_{x} is proportional the length L_{x}, thus the location of the fault can be calculated:

$L_x = 2 \cdot L \cdot \frac{R_{B1}}{R_{B1}+R_{B2}}$

where L is the total length of the cable under test - a value proportional to R_{g}.

The method assumes a single fault exists, of low resistance compared with the undamaged cable insulation resistance, and that the cable conductors have uniform resistance per unit length.

== Varley loop ==
The similar Varley loop uses fixed resistors for RB1 and RB2, and inserts a variable resistor in the faulted leg. Test sets for cable testing can be connected for either bridge technique. If the fault resistance is high, the sensitivity of the Murray bridge is reduced and the Varley loop may be more suitable.

== See also ==
- Fault (power engineering)
- Time-domain reflectometer
