= Time-domain reflectometer =

Electronic instrument

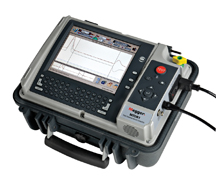
Time-domain reflectometer for cable fault detection

A time-domain reflectometer (TDR) is an electronic instrument used to determine the characteristics of electrical lines by observing reflected pulses. It can be used to characterize and locate faults in metallic cables (for example, twisted pair wire or coaxial cable), and to locate discontinuities in a connector, printed circuit board, or any other electrical path.

== Description ==
A TDR measures reflections along a conductor. In order to measure those reflections, the TDR will transmit an incident signal onto the conductor and listen for its reflections. If the conductor is of a uniform impedance and is properly terminated, then there will be no reflections and the remaining incident signal will be absorbed at the far-end by the termination. Instead, if there are impedance variations, then some of the incident signal will be reflected back to the source. A TDR is similar in principle to radar.

Signal (or energy) transmitted and reflected from a discontinuity

The impedance of the discontinuity can be determined from the amplitude of the reflected signal. The distance to the reflecting impedance can also be determined from the time that a pulse takes to return. The limitation of this method is the minimum system rise time. The total rise time consists of the combined rise time of the driving pulse and that of the oscilloscope or sampler that monitors the reflections.

=== Method ===
The TDR analysis begins with the propagation of a step or impulse of energy into a system and the subsequent observation of the energy reflected by the system. By analyzing the magnitude, duration and shape of the reflected waveform, the nature of the impedance variation in the transmission system can be determined.

If a pure resistive load is placed on the output of the reflectometer and a step signal is applied, a step signal is observed on the display, and its height is a function of the resistance. The magnitude of the step produced by the resistive load may be expressed as a fraction of the input signal as given by:

$$\rho = \frac{R_L - Z_0}{R_L + Z_0}$$

where $Z_0$ is the characteristic impedance of the transmission line.

=== Reflection ===
Generally, the reflections will have the same shape as the incident signal, but their sign and magnitude depend on the change in impedance level. If there is a step increase in the impedance, then the reflection will have the same sign as the incident signal; if there is a step decrease in impedance, the reflection will have the opposite sign. The magnitude of the reflection depends not only on the amount of the impedance change, but also upon the loss in the conductor.

The reflections are measured at the output/input to the TDR and displayed or plotted as a function of time. Alternatively, the display can be read as a function of cable length because the speed of signal propagation is almost constant for a given transmission medium.

Because of its sensitivity to impedance variations, a TDR may be used to verify cable impedance characteristics, splice and connector locations and associated losses, and estimate cable lengths.

=== Incident signal ===
TDRs use different incident signals. Some TDRs transmit a pulse along the conductor; the resolution of such instruments is often the width of the pulse. Narrow pulses can offer good resolution, but they have high frequency signal components that are attenuated in long cables. The shape of the pulse is often a half cycle sinusoid. For longer cables, wider pulse widths are used.

Fast rise time steps are also used. Instead of looking for the reflection of a complete pulse, the instrument is concerned with the rising edge, which can be very fast. A 1970s technology TDR used steps with a rise time of 25 ps.

Still other TDRs transmit complex signals and detect reflections with correlation techniques. See spread-spectrum time-domain reflectometry.

=== Variations and extensions ===
The equivalent device for optical fiber is an optical time-domain reflectometer.

Time-domain transmissometry (TDT) is an analogous technique that measures the transmitted (rather than reflected) impulse. Together, they provide a powerful means of analysing electrical or optical transmission media such as coaxial cable and optical fiber.

Variations of TDR exist. For example, spread-spectrum time-domain reflectometry (SSTDR) is used to detect intermittent faults in complex and high-noise systems such as aircraft wiring. Coherent optical time domain reflectometry (COTDR) is another variant, used in optical systems, in which the returned signal is mixed with a local oscillator and then filtered to reduce noise.

== Example traces ==
These traces were produced by a time-domain reflectometer made from common lab equipment connected to approximately 100 feet (30 m) of coaxial cable having a characteristic impedance of 50 ohms. The propagation velocity of this cable is approximately 66% of the speed of light in vacuum.

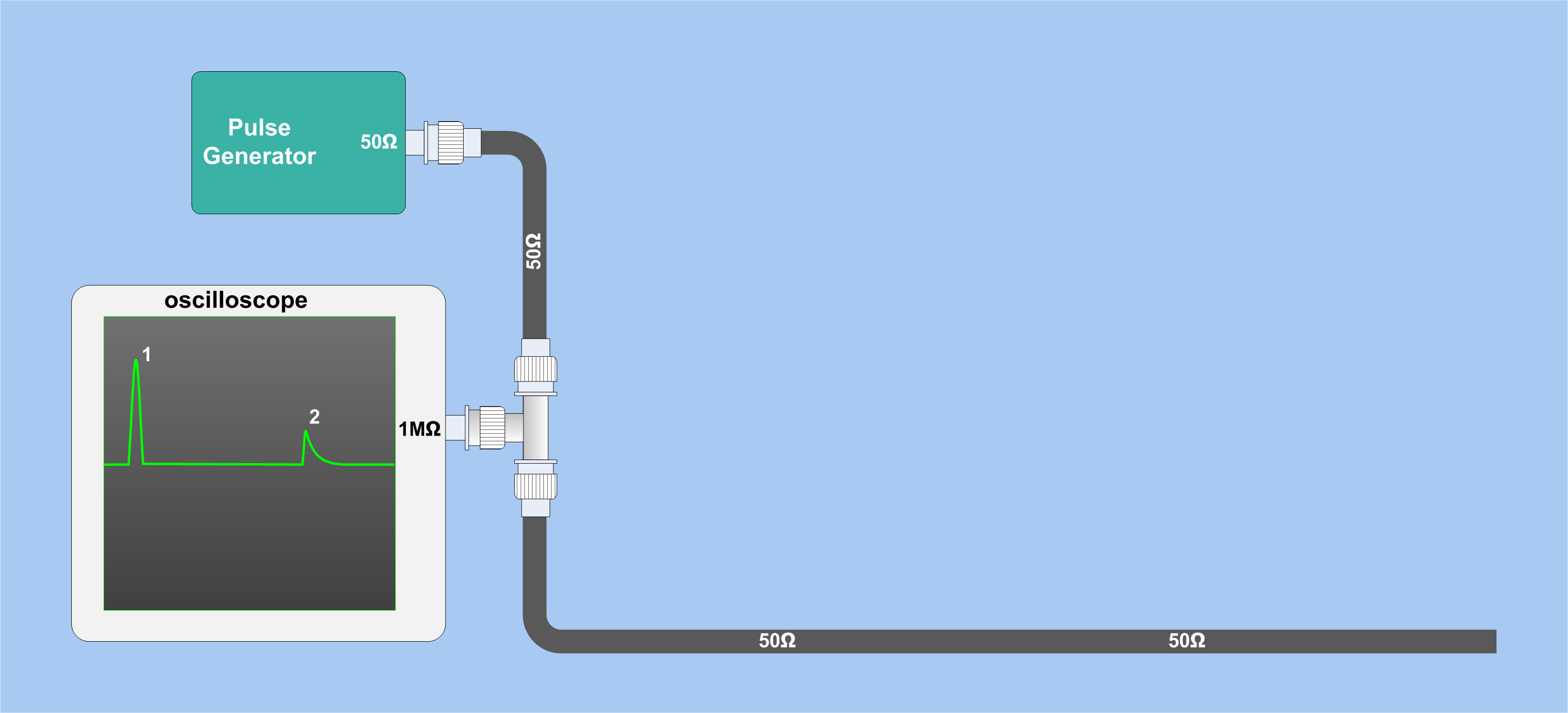
Simple TDR made from lab equipment

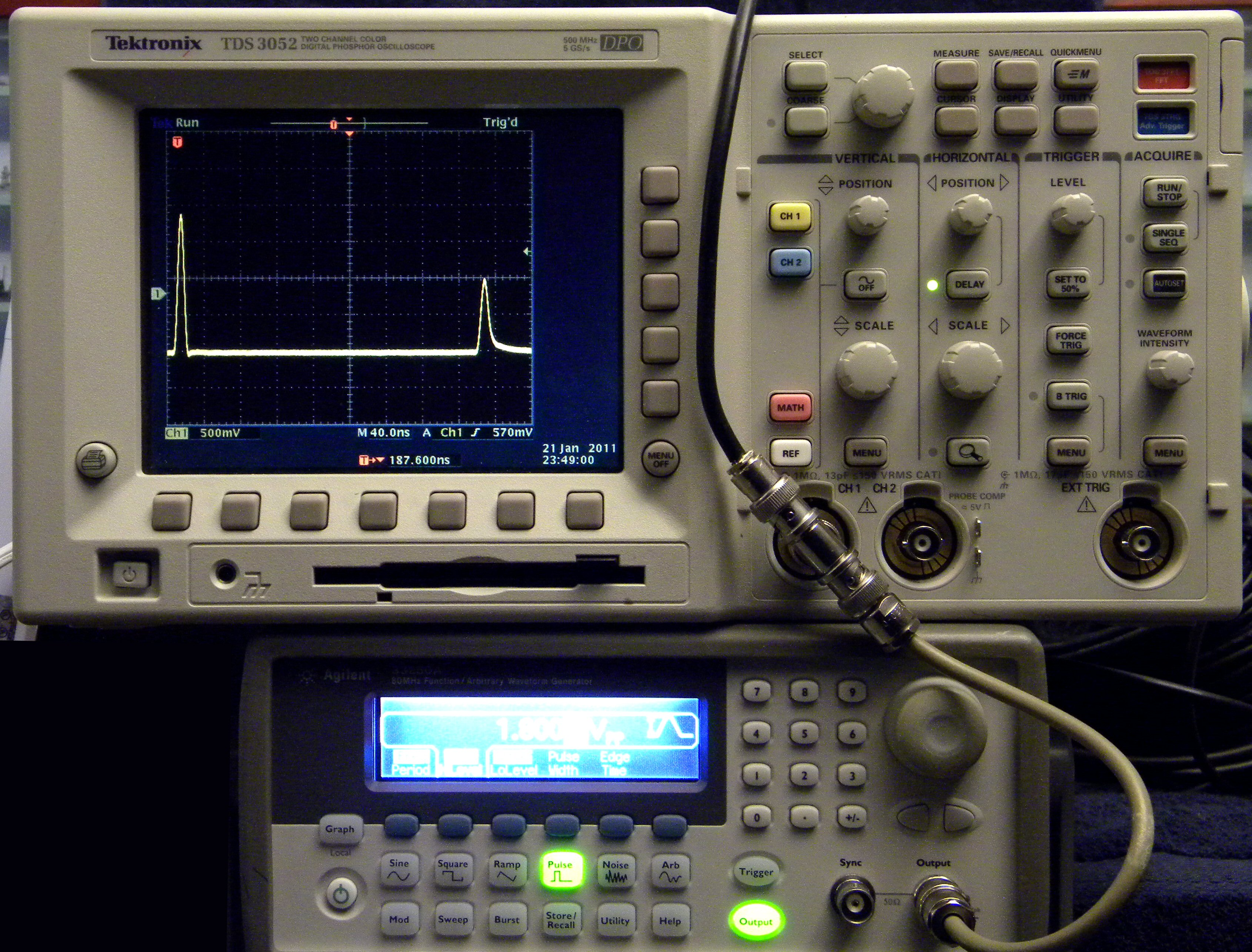
Simple TDR made from lab equipment

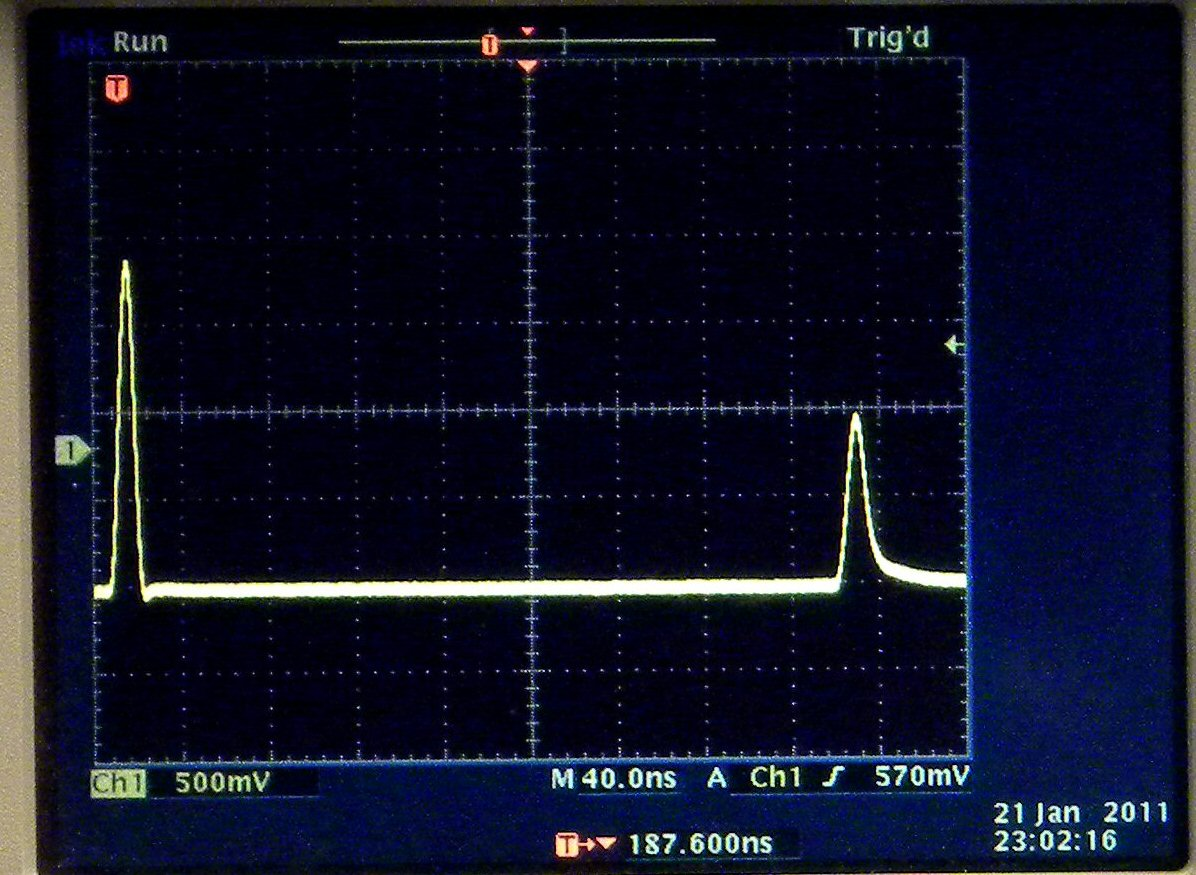
TDR trace of a transmission line with an open termination

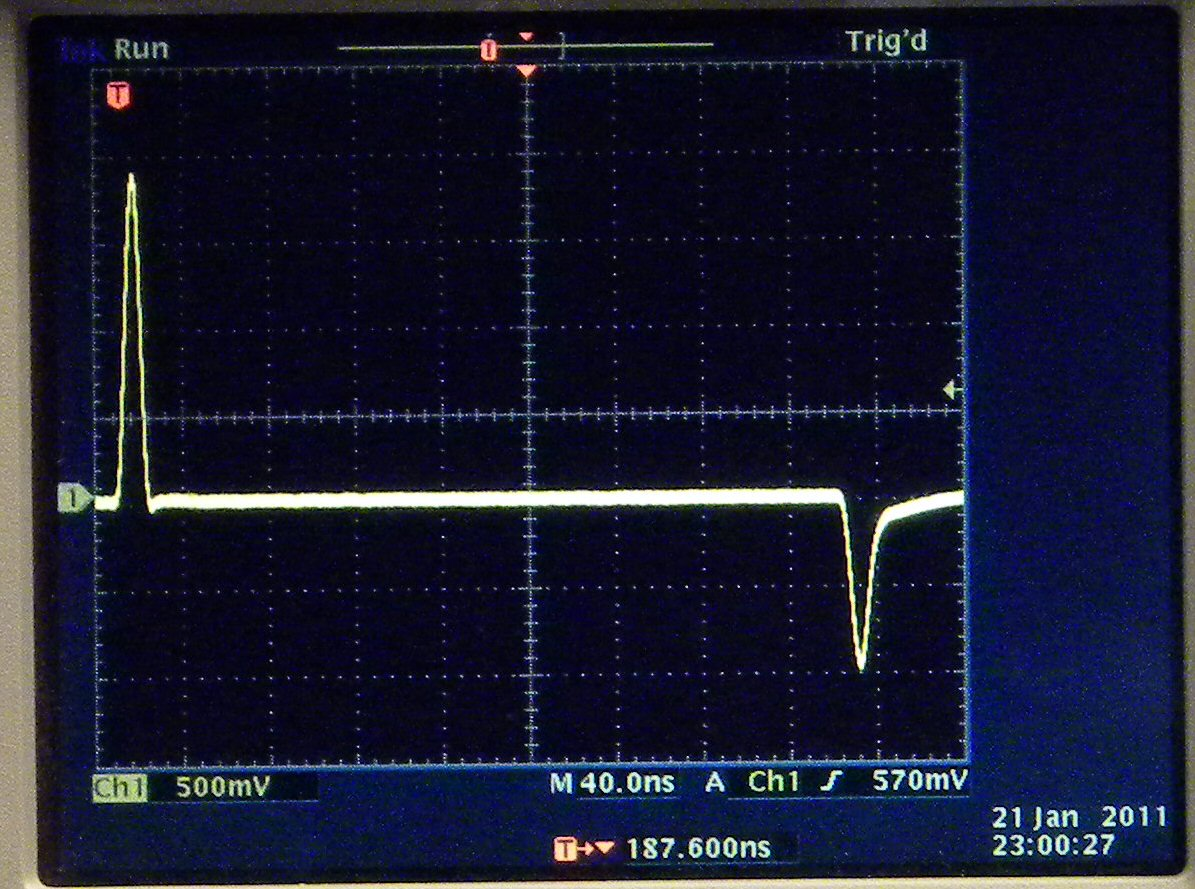
TDR trace of a transmission line with a short circuit termination

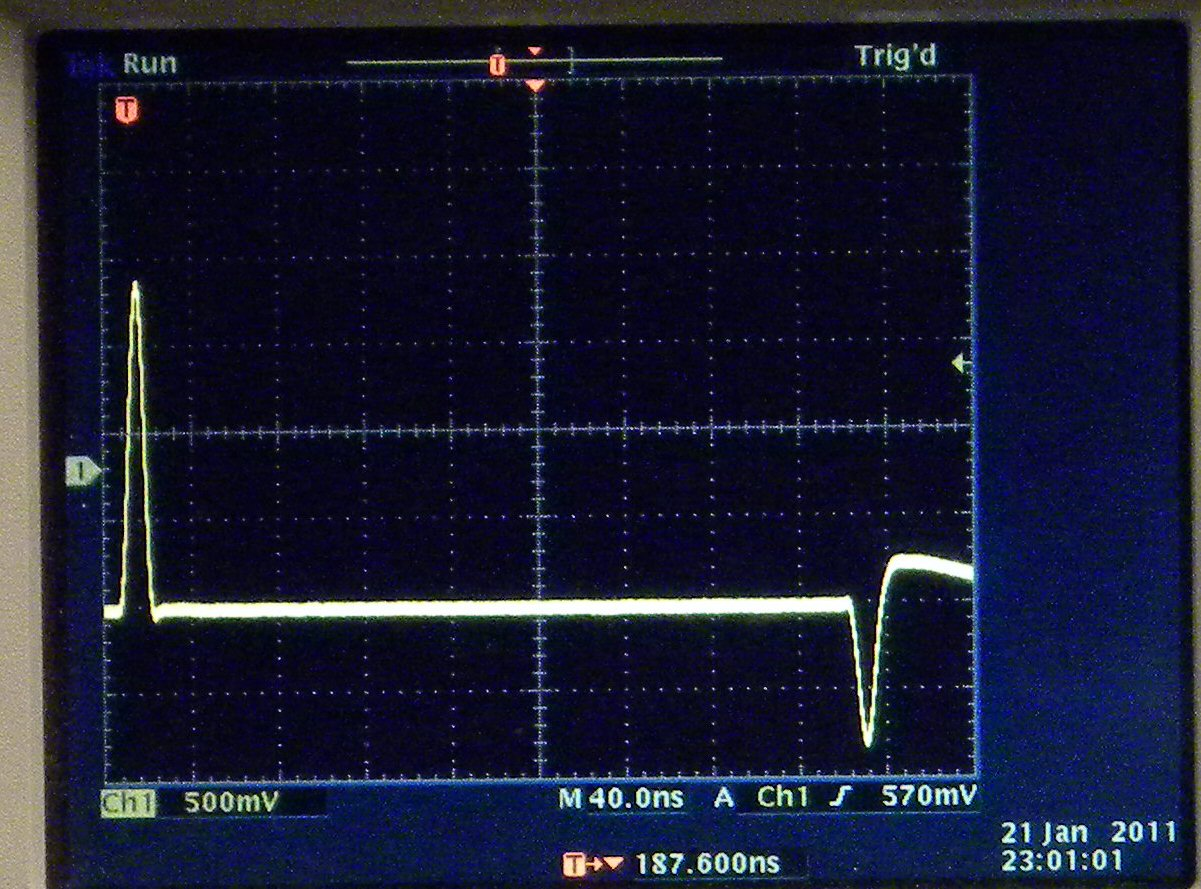
TDR trace of a transmission line with a 1nF capacitor termination

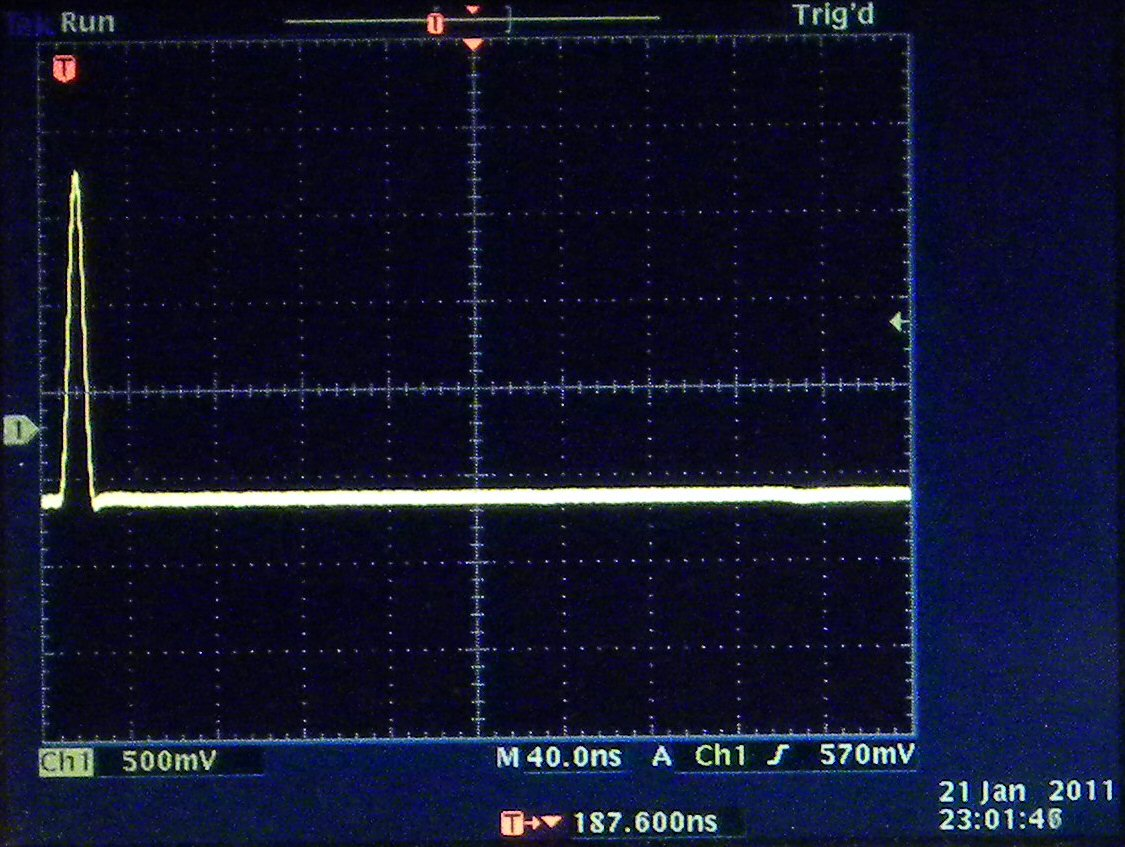
TDR trace of a transmission line with an almost ideal termination

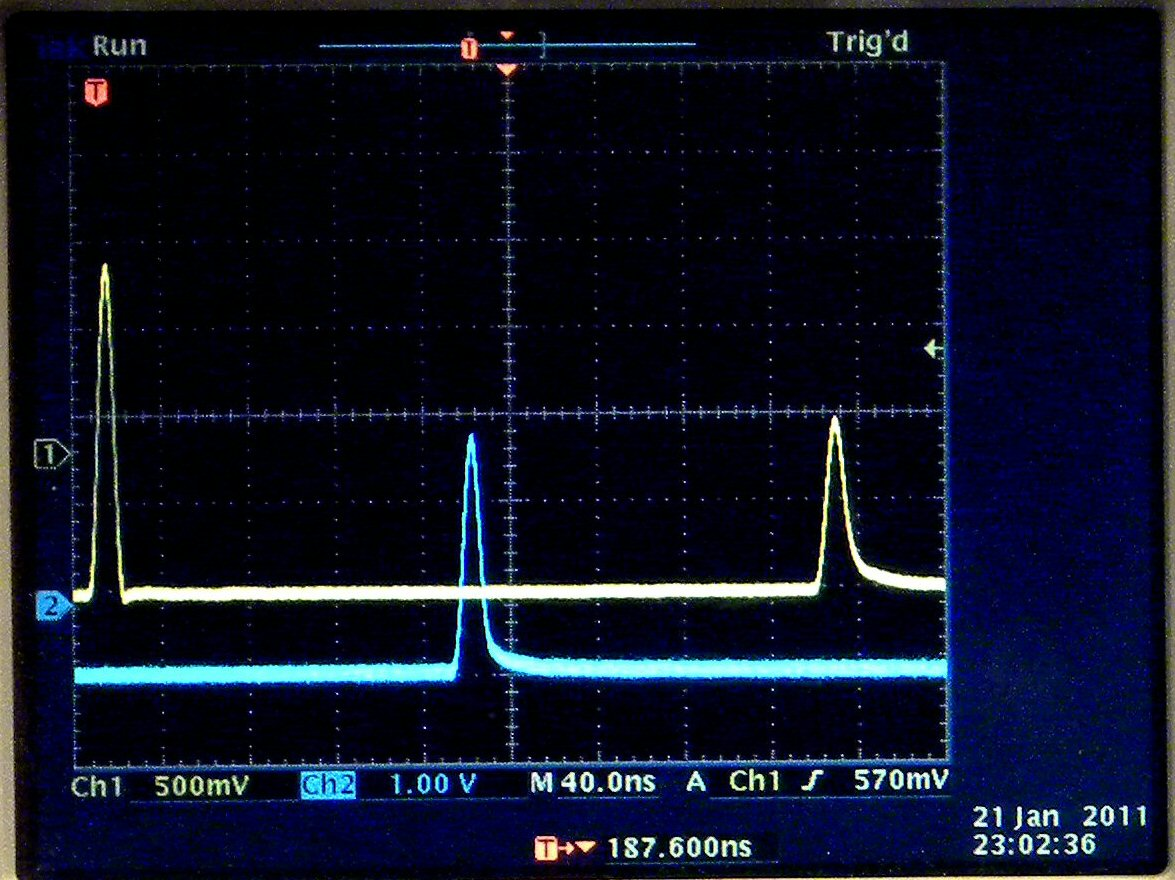
TDR trace of a transmission line terminated on an oscilloscope high impedance input. The blue trace is the pulse as seen at the far end. It is offset so that the baseline of each channel is visible

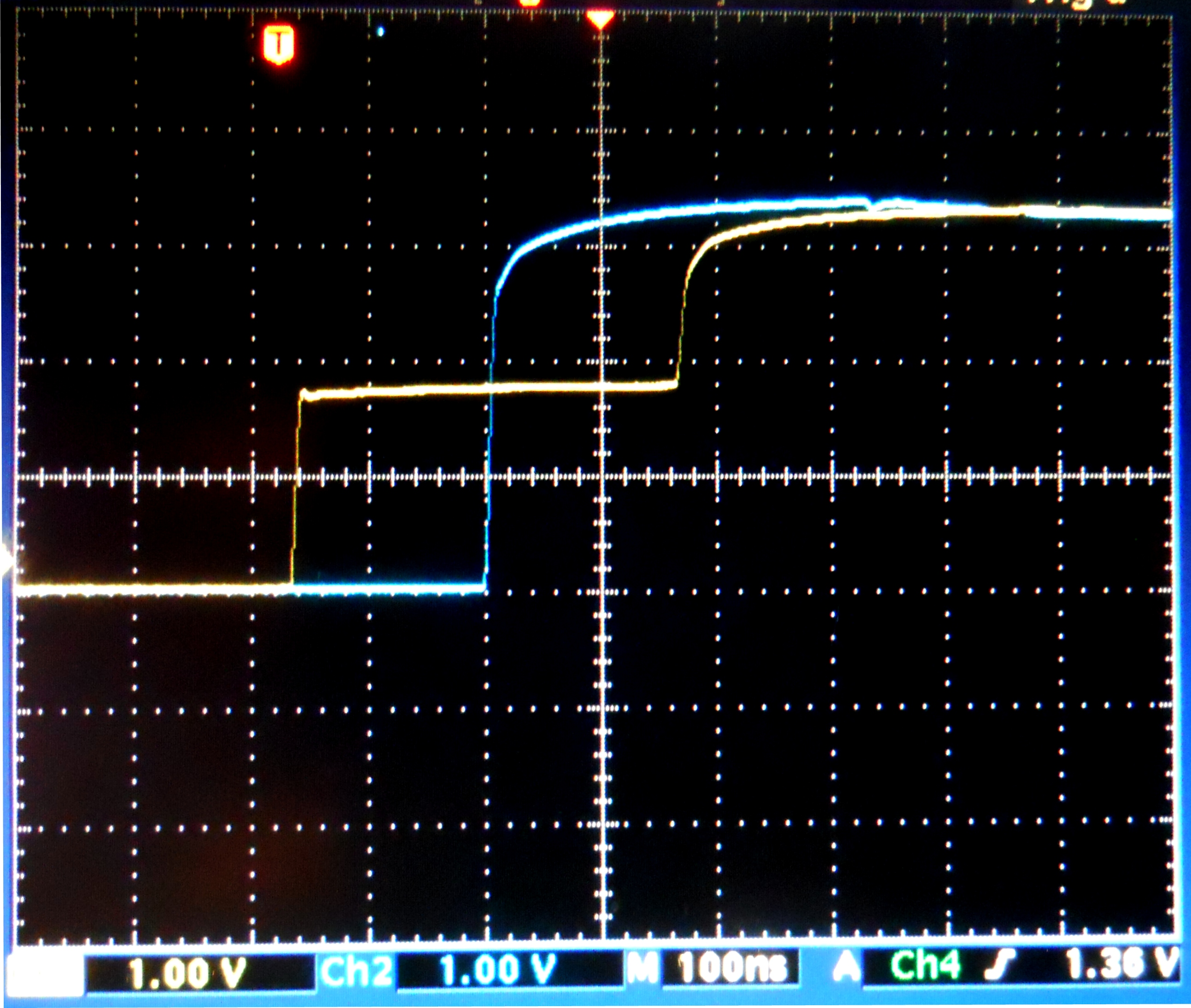
TDR trace of a transmission line terminated on an oscilloscope high impedance input driven by a step input from a matched source. The blue trace is the signal as seen at the far end.

These traces were produced by a commercial TDR using a step waveform with a 25 ps risetime, a sampling head with a 35 ps risetime, and an 18-inch (0.46 m) SMA cable. The far end of the SMA cable was left open or connected to different adapters. It takes about 3 ns for the pulse to travel down the cable, reflect, and reach the sampling head. A second reflection (at about 6 ns) can be seen in some traces; it is due to the reflection seeing a small mismatch at the sampling head and causing another "incident" wave to travel down the cable.

TDR of step into disconnected SMA male connector (non-precision open)
horizontal: 1 ns/div
vertical: 0.5 ρ/div

TDR of step into disconnected APC-7mm connector

TDR of step into APC-7mm precision open

TDR of step into APC-7mm precision load

TDR of step into APC-7mm precision short

TDR of step into APC-7mm precision open
horizontal: 20 ps/div

TDR of step into mated BNC connector pair; the peak reflection is 0.04
horizontal: 200 ps/div
vertical: 20 mρ/div

== Explanation ==
If the far end of the cable is shorted, that is, terminated with an impedance of zero ohms, and when the rising edge of the pulse is launched down the cable, the voltage at the launching point "steps up" to a given value instantly and the pulse begins propagating in the cable towards the short. When the pulse encounters the short, no energy is absorbed at the far end. Instead, an inverted pulse reflects back from the short towards the launching end. It is only when this reflection finally reaches the launch point that the voltage at this point abruptly drops back to zero, signaling the presence of a short at the end of the cable. That is, the TDR has no indication that there is a short at the end of the cable until its emitted pulse can travel in the cable and the echo can return. It is only after this round-trip delay that the short can be detected by the TDR. With knowledge of the signal propagation speed in the particular cable-under-test, the distance to the short can be measured.

A similar effect occurs if the far end of the cable is an open circuit (terminated into an infinite impedance). In this case, though, the reflection from the far end is polarized identically with the original pulse and adds to it rather than cancelling it out. So after a round-trip delay, the voltage at the TDR abruptly jumps to twice the originally-applied voltage.

Perfect termination at the far end of the cable would entirely absorb the applied pulse without causing any reflection, rendering the determination of the actual length of the cable impossible. In practice, some small reflection is nearly always observed.

The magnitude of the reflection is referred to as the reflection coefficient or ρ. The coefficient ranges from 1 (open circuit) to −1 (short circuit). The value of zero means that there is no reflection. The reflection coefficient is calculated as follows:
$$\rho = \frac{Z_\text{t} - Z_\text{o}}{Z_\text{t} + Z_\text{o}}$$
where Z_{o} is defined as the characteristic impedance of the transmission medium and Z_{t} is the impedance of the termination at the far end of the transmission line.

Any discontinuity can be viewed as a termination impedance and substituted as Z_{t}. This includes abrupt changes in the characteristic impedance. As an example, a trace width on a printed circuit board doubled at its midsection would constitute a discontinuity. Some of the energy will be reflected back to the driving source; the remaining energy will be transmitted. This is also known as a scattering junction.

== Usage ==
Time domain reflectometers are commonly used for in-place testing of very long cable runs, where it is impractical to dig up or remove what may be a kilometers-long cable. They are indispensable for preventive maintenance of telecommunication lines, as TDRs can detect resistance on joints and connectors as they corrode, and increasing insulation leakage as it degrades and absorbs moisture, long before either leads to catastrophic failures. Using a TDR, it is possible to pinpoint a fault to within centimetres.

TDRs are also very useful tools for technical surveillance counter-measures, where they help determine the existence and location of wire taps. The slight change in line impedance caused by the introduction of a tap or splice will show up on the screen of a TDR when connected to a phone line.

TDR equipment is also an essential tool in the failure analysis of modern high-frequency printed circuit boards with signal traces crafted to emulate transmission lines. Observing reflections can detect any unsoldered pins of a ball grid array device. Short-circuited pins can also be detected similarly.

The TDR principle is used in industrial settings, in situations as diverse as the testing of integrated circuit packages to measuring liquid levels. In the former, the time domain reflectometer is used to isolate failing sites in the same. The latter is primarily limited to the process industry.

=== In level measurement ===
In a TDR-based level measurement device, the device generates an impulse that propagates down a thin waveguide (referred to as a probe) – typically a metal rod or a steel cable. When this impulse hits the surface of the medium to be measured, part of the impulse reflects back up the waveguide. The device determines the fluid level by measuring the time difference between when the impulse was sent and when the reflection returned. The sensors can output the analyzed level as a continuous analog signal or switch output signals. In TDR technology, the impulse velocity is primarily affected by the permittivity of the medium through which the pulse propagates, which can vary greatly by the moisture content and temperature of the medium. In many cases, this effect can be corrected without undue difficulty. In some cases, such as in boiling and/or high temperature environments, the correction can be difficult. In particular, determining the froth (foam) height and the collapsed liquid level in a frothy / boiling medium can be very difficult.

=== Used in anchor cables in dams ===
The Dam Safety Interest Group of CEA Technologies, Inc. (CEATI), a consortium of electrical power organizations, has applied Spread-spectrum time-domain reflectometry to identify potential faults in concrete dam anchor cables. The key benefit of Time Domain reflectometry over other testing methods is the non-destructive method of these tests.

=== Used in the earth and agricultural sciences ===
A TDR is used to determine moisture content in soil and porous media. Over the last two decades, substantial advances have been made measuring moisture in soil, grain, food stuff, and sediment. The key to TDR's success is its ability to accurately determine the permittivity (dielectric constant) of a material from wave propagation, due to the strong relationship between the permittivity of a material and its water content, as demonstrated in the pioneering works of Hoekstra and Delaney (1974) and Topp et al. (1980). Recent reviews and reference work on the subject include, Topp and Reynolds (1998), Noborio (2001), Pettinellia et al. (2002), Topp and Ferre (2002) and Robinson et al. (2003). The TDR method is a transmission line technique, and determines apparent permittivity (Ka) from the travel time of an electromagnetic wave that propagates along a transmission line, usually two or more parallel metal rods embedded in soil or sediment. The probes are typically between 10 and 30 cm long and connected to the TDR via coaxial cable.

=== In geotechnical engineering ===
Time domain reflectometry has also been utilized to monitor slope movement in a variety of geotechnical settings, including highway cuts, rail beds, and open pit mines (Dowding & O'Connor, 1984, 2000a, 2000b; Kane & Beck, 1999). In TDR stability monitoring applications, a coaxial cable is installed in a vertical borehole passing through the region of concern. The electrical impedance at any point along a coaxial cable changes with deformation of the insulator between the conductors. A brittle grout surrounds the cable to translate earth movement into an abrupt cable deformation that shows up as a detectable peak in the reflectance trace. Until recently, the technique was relatively insensitive to small slope movements and could not be automated because it relied on human detection of changes in the reflectance trace over time. Farrington and Sargand (2004) developed a simple signal processing technique using numerical derivatives to extract reliable indications of slope movement from the TDR data much earlier than by conventional interpretation.

Another application of TDRs in geotechnical engineering is to determine the soil moisture content. This can be done by placing the TDRs in different soil layers and measuring the time of start of precipitation and the time that TDR indicates an increase in the soil moisture content. The depth of the TDR (d) is a known factor and the other is the time it takes the drop of water to reach that depth (t); therefore the speed of water infiltration (v) can be determined. This is a good method to assess the effectiveness of Best Management Practices (BMPs) in reducing stormwater surface runoff.

=== In semiconductor device analysis ===
Time domain reflectometry is used in semiconductor failure analysis as a non-destructive method for the location of defects in semiconductor device packages. The TDR provides an electrical signature of individual conductive traces in the device package, and is useful for determining the location of opens and shorts.

=== In aviation wiring maintenance ===
Time domain reflectometry, specifically spread-spectrum time-domain reflectometry is used on aviation wiring for both preventive maintenance and fault location. Spread spectrum time domain reflectometry has the advantage of precisely locating the fault location within thousands of miles of aviation wiring. Additionally, this technology is worth considering for real time aviation monitoring, as spread spectrum reflectometry can be employed on live wires.

This method has been shown to be useful to locating intermittent electrical faults.

Multi carrier time domain reflectometry (MCTDR) has also been identified as a promising method for embedded EWIS diagnosis or troubleshooting tools. Based on the injection of a multicarrier signal (respecting EMC and harmless for the wires), this smart technology provides information for the detection, localization and characterization of electrical defects (or mechanical defects having electrical consequences) in the wiring systems. Hard fault (short, open circuit) or intermittent defects can be detected very quickly increasing the reliability of wiring systems and improving their maintenance.

== See also ==
- Frequency domain sensor
- Murray loop bridge
- Noise-domain reflectometry
- Nicolson–Ross–Weir method
- Optical time-domain reflectometer
- Return loss
- Standing wave ratio
