= Touchstone file =

Network parameter data file

Touchstone File
- Filename extension: .s1p, .s2p, .s3p, .s4p, .snp, .ts
- Developed by: IBIS Open Forum, Agilent Technologies Inc
- Initial release: 1984; 42 years ago
- Latest release: 2.1; Jan 2024; 2 years ago
- Type of format: Document file format
- Standard: Touchstone
- Website: IBIS

A Touchstone file was originally a proprietary file format for the eponymous frequency-domain linear circuit simulator from EEsof, launched in 1984 and acquired by HP. The simulator has been called HP/EEsof, then its engine has been successively included in the jOmega and ADS software suites and it is now owned by Keysight.

The Touchstone simulator has long since been superseded, but its file format lives on.

A Touchstone file (also known as an SnP file after its set of file extensions) is an ASCII text file used for documenting the n-port network parameter data and noise data of linear active devices, passive filters, passive devices, or interconnect networks. An example of the format of the S-parameter section is given in the article about S-parameters. In addition to S-parameters, other representations such as Y-parameters and Z-parameters can be recorded.

It later became a de facto industry-standard file format not only for circuit simulators but also for measurement equipment (e.g. vector network analyzers, or VNAs), then later still an EIA standard as part of the Input/output Buffer Information Specification (IBIS) project. On April 24, 2009, the IBIS Open Forum ratified version 2.0, superseding Version 1.1. Version 2.0 adds IBIS-style keywords such as [Reference], which permits per-port definition of the reference environment. More recently on January 26, 2024 the IBIS Open Forum released version 2.1 which clarified the filename extension, introduced more flexible definitions for reference values of the network, and made corrections to several examples.

Several further enhancements to the file format that allow description of the non-linear behavior of the component have been developed under the P2D and S2D pair of formats, but these two have been superseded by the X-parameters functionality.
