= S2P =

S2P may refer to:

== Biochemistry ==
- Membrane-bound transcription factor peptidase, site 2, an enzyme

== Computing ==
- S2P File Format, a Touchstone File format for 2-port S-parameters
- S^{P}_{2}, a complexity class expressing "symmetric alternation"
- Microsoft Surface Pro 2, a Surface-series Windows 8 tablet

== UK Pensions ==
- State Second Pension
