= ISSO =

ISSO or Isso may refer to:

== Places ==
Italy

- Isso, Lombardy, a comune in the Province of Bergamo

== Other uses ==
- ISSO (Swaminarayan), an organisation under the Swaminarayan Sampraday
- Information Systems Security Officer, see chief information security officer (CISO)
- Current (designated 'I' in electronic engineering) involved the Simultaneous Switching Output (SSO) of Input/output Buffer Information Specification semiconductor simulation models.
