= Power gain =

Ratio of a circuit's output power to input

In electrical engineering, the power gain of an electrical network is the ratio of an output power to an input power. Unlike other signal gains, such as voltage and current gain, "power gain" may be ambiguous as the meaning of terms "input power" and "output power" is not always clear. Three important power gains are operating power gain, transducer power gain and available power gain. Note that all these definitions of power gains employ the use of average (as opposed to instantaneous) power quantities and therefore the term "average" is often suppressed, which can be confusing at occasions.

== Operating power gain ==
The operating power gain of a two-port network, G_{P}, is defined as:

$$G_P = \frac{P_\mathrm{L}}{P_\mathrm{I}}$$

where

- P_{L} is the maximum time-averaged power delivered to the load, where the maximization is over the load impedance, i.e., we desire the load impedance which maximizes the time-averaged power delivered to the load.
- P_{I} is the time-averaged input power to the network.

If the time-averaged input power depends on the load impedance, one must take the maximum of the ratio, not just the maximum of the numerator.

== Transducer power gain ==
The transducer power gain of a two-port network, G_{T}, is defined as:

$G_T = \frac{P_\mathrm{L}}{P_\mathrm{S\ max}}$

where

- P_{L} is the average power delivered to the load
- P_{S max} is the maximum available average power at the source

In terms of y-parameters this definition can be used to derive:

$$G_T = \frac{4|y_{21}|^2 \Re{(Y_\mathrm{L})}\Re{(Y_\mathrm{S})}}{ \bigl|(y_{11}+Y_\mathrm{S})(y_{22}+Y_\mathrm{L})-y_{12}y_{21} \bigr|^2}$$

where

- Y_{L} is the load admittance
- Y_{S} is the source admittance

This result can be generalized to z, h, g and y-parameters as:

$$G_T = \frac{4|k_{21}|^2 \Re{(M_\mathrm{L})}\Re{(M_\mathrm{S})}}{ \bigl|(k_{11}+M_\mathrm{S})(k_{22}+M_\mathrm{L})-k_{12}k_{21} \bigr|^2}$$

where

- k_{xx} is a z, h, g or y-parameter
- M_{L} is the load value in the corresponding parameter set
- M_{S} is the source value in the corresponding parameter set

P_{S max} may only be obtained from the source when the load impedance connected to it (i.e. the equivalent input impedance of the two-port network) is the complex conjugate of the source impedance, a consequence of the maximum power theorem.

== Available power gain ==
The available power gain of a two-port network, G_{A}, is defined as:

$G_A = \frac{P_\mathrm{L\ max}}{P_\mathrm{S\ max}}$

where

- P_{L max} is the maximum available average power at the load
- P_{S max} is the maximum power available from the source

Similarly P_{L max} may only be obtained when the load impedance is the complex conjugate of the output impedance of the network.
