= Generator (circuit theory) =

Non-ideal voltage source model (left) and non-ideal current source model (right)

A generator in electrical circuit theory is one of two ideal elements: an ideal voltage source, or an ideal current source. These are two of the fundamental elements in circuit theory. Real electrical generators are most commonly modelled as a non-ideal source consisting of a combination of an ideal source and a resistor. Voltage generators are modelled as an ideal voltage source in series with a resistor. Current generators are modelled as an ideal current source in parallel with a resistor. The resistor is referred to as the internal resistance of the source. Real world equipment may not perfectly follow these models, especially at extremes of loading (both high and low), but for most purposes, they suffice.

The two models of non-ideal generators are interchangeable; either can be used for any given generator. Thévenin's theorem allows a non-ideal current source model to be converted to a non-ideal voltage source model and Norton's theorem allows a non-ideal voltage source model to be converted to a non-ideal current source model. Both models are equally valid, but the voltage source model is more applicable when the internal resistance is low (that is, much lower than the load impedance), and the current source model is more applicable when the internal resistance is high (compared to the load).

== Symbols ==
| Ideal voltage source | Ideal current source |
| Controlled voltage source | Controlled current source |
| Battery of cells | Single cell |

Symbols used for ideal sources

Symbols commonly used for ideal sources are shown in the figure. Symbols do vary from region to region and time period to time period. Another common symbol for a current source is two interlocking circles.

== Dependent sources ==
A dependent source is one in which the voltage or current of the source output is dependent on another voltage or current elsewhere in the circuit. There are thus four possible types: current-dependent voltage source, voltage-dependent voltage source, current-dependent current source, and voltage-dependent current source. Non-ideal dependent sources can be modelled with the addition of an impedance in the same way as non-dependent sources. These elements are widely used to model the function of two-port networks; one generator is needed for each port, and it is dependent on either voltage or current at the other port. The models are an example of black box modelling; that is, they are quite unrelated to what is physically inside the device but correctly model the device's function. There are a number of these two-port models, differing only in the type of generator required to represent them. This kind of model is particularly useful for modelling the behaviour of transistors.

Dependent sources used to represent a two-port network in h-parameters

The model used to represent h-parameters is shown in the figure. h-parameters are frequently used in transistor data sheets to specify the device. The h-parameters are defined as the matrix

$$\begin{bmatrix} V_1 \\ I_2 \end{bmatrix} = \begin{bmatrix} h_{11} & h_{12} \\ h_{21} & h_{22} \end{bmatrix} \begin{bmatrix} I_1 \\ V_2 \end{bmatrix}$$

where the voltage and current variables are as shown in the figure. The circuit model using dependent generators is just an alternative way of representing this matrix.
