= X-parameters =

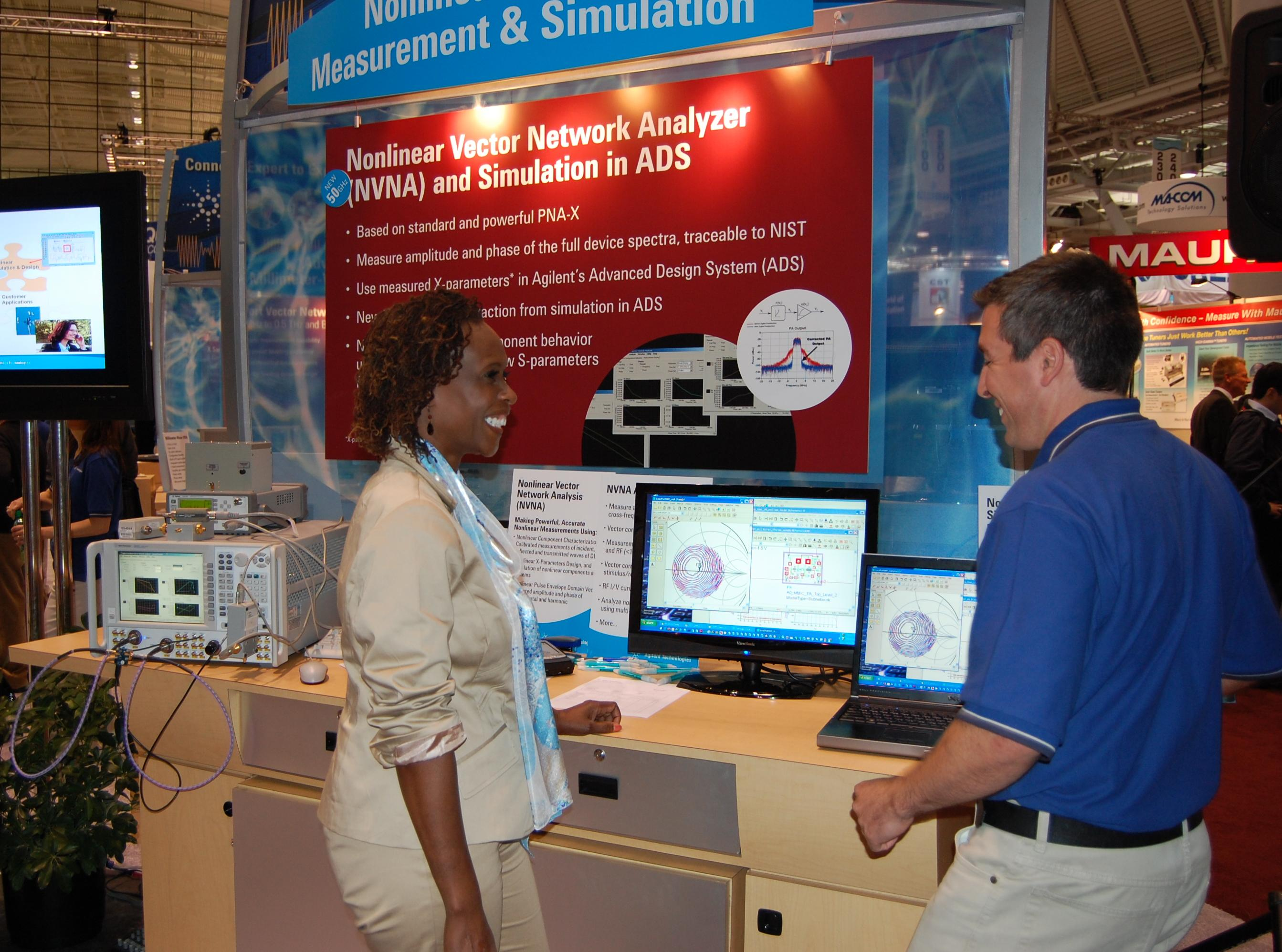
Agilent engineer demonstrates X-parameter functionality at IEEE MTT-S International Microwave Symposium, Boston MA June 10, 2009.)

X-parameters are a generalization of S-parameters and are used for characterizing the amplitudes and relative phase of harmonics generated by nonlinear components under large input power levels. X-parameters are also referred to as the parameters of the Poly-Harmonic Distortion (PHD) nonlinear behavioral model.

== Description ==
X-parameters represent a new category of nonlinear network parameters for high-frequency design (Nonlinear vector network analyzers are sometimes called large signal network analyzers.)

X-parameters are applicable to both large-signal and small-signal conditions, for linear and nonlinear components. They are an extension of S-parameters meaning that, in the limit of a small signal, X-parameters reduce to S-parameters.

They help overcome a key challenge in RF engineering, namely that nonlinear impedance differences, harmonic mixing, and nonlinear reflection effects occur when components are cascaded under large signal operating conditions. This means that there is a nonlinear and as such non-trivial relationship between the properties of the individual cascaded components and the composite properties of the resulting cascade. This situation is unlike that at DC, where one can simply add the values of resistors connected in series. X-parameters help solve this cascading problem: if the X-parameters of a set of components are measured individually, the X-parameters (and hence the non-linear transfer function) can be calculated of any cascade made from them. Calculations based on X-parameters are usually performed within a harmonic balance simulator environment.

== Development ==
X-parameters were developed and introduced by Keysight Technologies as functionality included in N5242A Nonlinear Vector Network Analyzer, and the W2200 Advanced Design System in 2008.

X-parameters are the parameters of the polyharmonic distortion modeling work of Dr. Jan Verspecht and Dr. David E. Root.

== See also ==
- Two-port network
