= Impedance parameters =

Set of properties used in electrical engineering

Impedance parameters or Z-parameters (the elements of an impedance matrix or Z-matrix) are properties used in electrical engineering, electronic engineering, and communication systems engineering to describe the electrical behavior of linear electrical networks. They are also used to describe the small-signal (linearized) response of non-linear networks. They are members of a family of similar parameters used in electronic engineering, other examples being: S-parameters, Y-parameters, H-parameters, T-parameters or ABCD-parameters.

Z-parameters are also known as open-circuit impedance parameters as they are calculated under open circuit conditions. i.e., I_{x}=0, where x=1,2 refer to input and output currents flowing through the ports (of a two-port network in this case) respectively.

== The Z-parameter matrix ==
A Z-parameter matrix describes the behaviour of any linear electrical network that can be regarded as a black box with a number of ports. A port in this context is a pair of electrical terminals carrying equal and opposite currents into and out-of the network, and having a particular voltage between them. The Z-matrix gives no information about the behaviour of the network when the currents at any port are not balanced in this way (should this be possible), nor does it give any information about the voltage between terminals not belonging to the same port. Typically, it is intended that each external connection to the network is between the terminals of just one port, so that these limitations are appropriate.

For a generic multi-port network definition, it is assumed that each of the ports is allocated an integer n ranging from 1 to N, where N is the total number of ports. For port n, the associated Z-parameter definition is in terms of the port current and port voltage, $I_n\,$ and $V_n\,$ respectively.

For all ports the voltages may be defined in terms of the Z-parameter matrix and the currents by the following matrix equation:

$$V = Z I\,$$

where Z is an N × N matrix the elements of which can be indexed using conventional matrix notation. In general the elements of the Z-parameter matrix are complex numbers and functions of frequency. For a one-port network, the Z-matrix reduces to a single element, being the ordinary impedance measured between the two terminals. The Z-parameters are also known as the open circuit parameters because they are measured or calculated by applying current to one port and determining the resulting voltages at all the ports while the undriven ports are terminated into open circuits.

== Two-port networks ==
The equivalent circuit for Z-parameters of a two-port network.

The equivalent circuit for Z-parameters of a reciprocal two-port network.

The Z-parameter matrix for the two-port network is probably the most common. In this case the relationship between the port currents, port voltages and the Z-parameter matrix is given by:

$$\begin{pmatrix} V_1 \\ V_2\end{pmatrix} = \begin{pmatrix} Z_{11} & Z_{12} \\ Z_{21} & Z_{22} \end{pmatrix}\begin{pmatrix}I_1 \\ I_2\end{pmatrix}$$.

where

$$Z_{11} = {V_1 \over I_1 } \bigg|_{I_2 = 0} \qquad Z_{12} = {V_1 \over I_2 } \bigg|_{I_1 = 0}$$

$$Z_{21} = {V_2 \over I_1 } \bigg|_{I_2 = 0} \qquad Z_{22} = {V_2 \over I_2 } \bigg|_{I_1 = 0}$$

For the general case of an N-port network,

$$Z_{nm} = {V_n \over I_m } \bigg|_{I_k = 0 \text{ for } k \ne m}$$

=== Impedance relations ===
The input impedance of a two-port network is given by:

$$Z_\text{in} = Z_{11} - \frac{Z_{12}Z_{21}}{Z_{22}+Z_L}$$

where Z_{L} is the impedance of the load connected to port two.

Similarly, the output impedance is given by:

$$Z_\text{out} = Z_{22} - \frac{Z_{12}Z_{21}}{Z_{11}+Z_S}$$

where Z_{S} is the impedance of the source connected to port one.

== Relation to S-parameters ==
The Z-parameters of a network are related to its S-parameters by

$$\begin{align}
Z &= \sqrt{z} (1_{\!N} + S) (1_{\!N} - S)^{-1} \sqrt{z} \\
&= \sqrt{z} (1_{\!N} - S)^{-1} (1_{\!N} + S) \sqrt{z} \\
\end{align}$$

and

$$\begin{align}
S &= (\sqrt{y}Z\sqrt{y} \,- 1_{\!N}) (\sqrt{y}Z\sqrt{y} \,+ 1_{\!N})^{-1} \\
&= (\sqrt{y}Z\sqrt{y} \,+ 1_{\!N})^{-1} (\sqrt{y}Z\sqrt{y} \,- 1_{\!N}) \\
\end{align}$$

where $1_{\!N}$ is the identity matrix, $\sqrt{z}$ is a diagonal matrix having the square root of the characteristic impedance at each port as its non-zero elements,

$$\sqrt{z} = \begin{pmatrix}
\sqrt{z_{01}} &  \\
& \sqrt{z_{02}} \\
&            & \ddots \\
&            &           & \sqrt{z_{0N}}
\end{pmatrix}$$

and $\sqrt{y} = (\sqrt{z})^{-1}$ is the corresponding diagonal matrix of square roots of characteristic admittances. In these expressions the matrices represented by the bracketed factors commute and so, as shown above, may be written in either order. (Note: Any square matrix commutes with itself and with the identity matrix, and if two matrices A and B commute, then so do A and B^{−1} (since AB^{−1} = B^{−1}BAB^{−1} = B^{−1}ABB^{−1} = B^{−1}A))

=== Two port ===
In the special case of a two-port network, with the same characteristic impedance $z_{01} = z_{02} = Z_0$ at each port, the above expressions reduce to

$$Z_{11} = {((1 + S_{11}) (1 - S_{22}) + S_{12} S_{21}) \over \Delta_S} Z_0 \,$$

$$Z_{12} = {2 S_{12} \over \Delta_S} Z_0 \,$$

$$Z_{21} = {2 S_{21} \over \Delta_S} Z_0 \,$$

$$Z_{22} = {((1 - S_{11}) (1 + S_{22}) + S_{12} S_{21}) \over \Delta_S} Z_0 \,$$

Where

$$\Delta_S = (1 - S_{11}) (1 - S_{22}) - S_{12} S_{21} \,$$

The two-port S-parameters may be obtained from the equivalent two-port Z-parameters by means of the following expressions

$$S_{11} = {(Z_{11} - Z_0) (Z_{22} + Z_0) - Z_{12} Z_{21} \over \Delta}$$

$$S_{12} = {2 Z_0 Z_{12} \over \Delta} \,$$

$$S_{21} = {2 Z_0 Z_{21} \over \Delta} \,$$

$$S_{22} = {(Z_{11} + Z_0) (Z_{22} - Z_0) - Z_{12} Z_{21} \over \Delta}$$

where

$$\Delta = (Z_{11} + Z_0) (Z_{22} + Z_0) - Z_{12} Z_{21} \,$$

The above expressions will generally use complex numbers for $S_{ij} \,$ and $Z_{ij} \,$. Note that the value of $\Delta\,$ can become 0 for specific values of $Z_{ij} \,$ so the division by $\Delta \,$ in the calculations of $S_{ij} \,$ may lead to a division by 0.

== Relation to Y-parameters ==
Conversion from Y-parameters to Z-parameters is much simpler, as the Z-parameter matrix is just the inverse of the Y-parameter matrix. For a two-port:

$$Z_{11} = {Y_{22} \over \Delta_Y} \,$$

$$Z_{12} = {-Y_{12} \over \Delta_Y} \,$$

$$Z_{21} = {-Y_{21} \over \Delta_Y} \,$$

$$Z_{22} = {Y_{11} \over \Delta_Y} \,$$

where

$$\Delta_Y = Y_{11} Y_{22} - Y_{12} Y_{21} \,$$

is the determinant of the Y-parameter matrix.

== Bibliography ==
- David M. Pozar (2004-02-05). Microwave Engineering. Wiley. ISBN 978-0-471-44878-5.
- Simon Ramo; John R. Whinnery; Theodore Van Duzer (1994-02-09). Fields and Waves in Communication Electronics. Wiley. ISBN 978-0-471-58551-0.

== See also ==
- Scattering parameters
- Admittance parameters
- Two-port network
