= Input/output Buffer Information Specification =

Secure specification for IC interface

Input/output Buffer Information Specification (IBIS) is a specification of a method for integrated circuit vendors to provide information about the input/output buffers of their product to their prospective customers without revealing the intellectual property of their implementation and without requiring proprietary encryption keys. From version 5.0, specification contains two separate types of models, "traditional IBIS" and "IBIS-AMI." The traditional model is generated in text format and consists of a number of tables that captures current vs. voltage (IV) and voltage vs. time (Vt) characteristics of the buffer, as well as the values of certain parasitic components. It is a standard data exchange format for exchanging modeling information among semiconductor device suppliers, simulation software suppliers, and end users.

Traditional IBIS models are generally used instead of SPICE models to perform various board level signal integrity (SI) simulations and timing analyses. IBIS models could be used to verify signal integrity requirements, especially for high-speed products.

IBIS-AMI models run in a special-purpose SerDes channel simulator, not in a SPICE-like simulator, and consist of two text files (*.ibs and *.ami) plus a platform-specific machine code executable file (*.dll on Windows, *.so on Linux). IBIS-AMI support statistical and so-called time-domain channel simulations, and three types of IC model ("impulse-only," "GetWave-only," and "dual mode")

== History ==
Intel initiated IBIS in the early 1990s. Intel needed to have all of its divisions to present a common standardized model format to its external customers. This prompted Intel to solicit EDA vendors to participate in the development of a common model format. The first IBIS model, version 1.0, was aimed at describing CMOS circuits and TTL I/O buffers.

As IBIS evolved with the participation of more companies and industry members, an IBIS Open Forum was created to promote the application of IBIS as a simulation tool format and to make sure that a standard exists. Many semiconductor vendors supply IBIS models and many EDA vendors sell IBIS-compliant software tools. In 1995 the IBIS Open Forum teamed with the American National Standards Institute/Electronic Industries Alliance (ANSI/EIA). IBIS version 2.1 was the first version released by the new alliance. It added the ability to simulate ECL and PECL buffers as well as differential lines. IBIS 3.2 allows for a package model description along with an electrical board description. IBIS Version 5.0 was ratified by the IBIS Open Forum on August 29, 2008. Compared to the previous version (IBIS 4.2, ANSI/EIA-656-B), it adds a new flow based not on SPICE transient but on a channel simulator (called algorithmic model application program interface or AMI flow), power integrity, and EMC checking features. For power integrity, it uses Touchstone 2.0 S-parameter files with per-port reference impedance specification.

Version 5.1 was ratified on August 24, 2012. Important changes included the so-called "flow BIRD" which resolved many ambiguities in the IBIS AMI flow.

The IBIS Open Forum became an official subcommittee of TechAmerica in January 2009. Upon its purchase of the standards program of TechAmerica in July 2013, SAE International became the parent of IBIS Open Forum. IBIS is an "industry program" within the SAE Industry Technologies Consortia (SAE ITC) trade association.

== Evolution ==
IBIS is an evolving standard with many proposed changes submitted to IBIS Open Forum for consideration. Proposed changes are called BIRDs (Buffer Issue Resolution Documents), a play on the word ibis, a type of bird.

Version 6.0 was ratified on September 20, 2013. Changes included an IBIS‐AMI extension for mid-channel repeaters, new parameters for jitter and noise in IBIS-AMI, and analog buffer modeling improvements.

Version 6.1 was ratified on September 11, 2015. Changes included support of PAM-4 in IBIS-AMI, the addition of a new Initial Delay keyword, and additional options for overclocking.

Version 7.0 was ratified on March 15, 2019. Changes included support for Touchstone and IBI-ISS (SPICE) modeling of interconnections, and modeling of back-channel link training protocols using IBIS-AMI models.

Work on enhancing the specification can be tracked in the work-in-progress section of the IBIS Open Forum website.
