= Ernest Wilkinson =

Ernest Wilkinson may refer to:

- Ernest L. Wilkinson (1899–1978), American academic administrator, lawyer, and prominent figure in the Church of Jesus Christ of Latter-day Saints
- Ernest Berdoe Wilkinson (1864–1946), British Army officer
- Ernie Wilkinson (born 1947), English footballer
- Ernest J. Wilkinson, published on the Wilkinson power divider, a specific class of power divider circuit
