= Two-tone =

Two-tone, two tone, or 2 tone, etc., may refer to:

== Audio and sound ==
- Two-tone analysis, in nonlinear system measurement
- Two-tone attention signal
- Two-tone chime, such as the "ding dong" sound of a doorbell
- Two-tone sequential paging, selective calling method in analog 2-way radio transmission
- Two-tone siren, a European type of siren

== Language ==
- Two-tone language
- Diphthong (Greek for two tones), in linguistics, a gliding vowel

== Music ==
- Two-tone (music genre), music genre
- 2 Tone Records, record label
- Two Tone Club, French ska band
- "Two-Tone" Tommy, bass musician

== Other ==
- Two-tone color, such as RG color space
- Two-tone paint
- Two-tone pattern
- Two-toned lobsterette
- Two-Tone, dalmatian dog in the 2003 animated film 101 Dalmatians II: Patch's London Adventure and 1996 remake
- Two-tone testing, a test in radio systems for intermodulation distortion

== See also ==
- Tone (disambiguation)
- Tommy Tutone
