= Magic tee =

Type of radio-frequency coupler

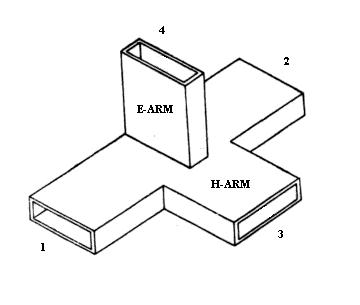
A magic T consisting of four rectangular waveguides meeting in a single three-dimensional junction

A magic tee (or magic T or hybrid tee) is a hybrid or 3 dB antisymmetric coupler used in microwave systems. It is an alternative to the rat-race coupler. In contrast to the rat-race, the three-dimensional structure of the magic tee makes it less readily constructed in planar technologies such as microstrip or stripline.

The magic comes from the way it prevents signals from propagating between certain ports under specific conditions. This allows it to be used as a duplexer; for instance, it can be used to isolate the transmitter and receiver in a radar system while sharing the antenna. In practical examples, it is used to both isolate circuits and mix signals, for instance in a COHO radar.

The magic tee was originally developed in World War II, and first published by W. A. Tyrell of Bell Labs in a 1947 IRE paper. Robert L. Kyhl and Bob Dicke independently created magic tees around the same time.

== Structure ==
The magic tee is a combination of E and H plane tees. Arm 3 forms an H-plane tee with arms 1 and 2. Arm 4 forms an E-plane tee with arms 1 and 2. Arms 1 and 2 are sometimes called the side or collinear arms. Port 3 is called the H-plane port, and is also called the Σ port, sum port or the P-port (for "parallel"). Port 4 is the E-plane port, and is also called the Δ port, difference port, or S-port (for "series"). There is no one single established convention regarding the numbering of the ports.

To function correctly, the magic tee must incorporate an internal matching structure. This structure typically consists of a post inside the H-plane tee and an inductive iris inside the E-plane limb, though many alternative structures have been proposed. Dependence on the matching structure means that the magic tee will only work over a limited frequency band.

== Operation ==
The name magic tee is derived from the way in which power is divided among the various ports. A signal injected into the H-plane port will be divided equally between ports 1 and 2, and will be in phase. A signal injected into the E-plane port will also be divided equally between ports 1 and 2, but will be 180 degrees out of phase. If signals are fed in through ports 1 and 2, they are added at the H-plane port and subtracted at the E-plane port. Thus, with the ports numbered as shown, and to within a phase factor, the full scattering matrix for an ideal magic tee is

$$S = \frac{1}{\sqrt{2}}
\begin{pmatrix}
0 & 0 & 1 & 1 \\
0 & 0 & 1 & -1 \\
1 & 1 & 0 &  0 \\
1 & -1 & 0 &  0
\end{pmatrix}$$

(the signs of the elements in the fourth row and fourth column of this matrix may be reversed, depending on the polarity assumed for port 4).

== Magic ==
If, by means of a suitable internal structure, the E-plane (difference) and H-plane (sum) ports are simultaneously matched, then by symmetry, reciprocity and conservation of energy it may be shown that the two collinear ports are also matched, and are 'magically' isolated from each other.

The E-field of the dominant mode in each port is perpendicular to the broad wall of the waveguide. The signals in the E-plane and H-plane ports therefore have orthogonal polarizations, and so (considering the symmetry of the structure) there can be no communication between these two ports.

For a signal entering the H-plane port, a well-designed matching structure will prevent any of the power in the signal being reflected back out of the same port. As there can be no communication with the E-plane port, and again considering the symmetry of the structure, then the power in this signal must be divided equally between the two collinear ports.

Similarly for the E-plane port, if the matching structure eliminates any reflection from this port, then the power entering it must be divided equally between the two collinear ports.

Now by reciprocity, the coupling between any pair of ports is the same in either direction (the scattering matrix is symmetric). So if the H-plane port is matched, then half the power entering either one of the collinear ports will leave by the H-plane port. If the E-plane port is also matched, then half power will leave by the E-plane port. In this circumstance, there is no power 'left over' either to be reflected out of the first collinear port or to be transmitted to the other collinear port. Despite apparently being in direct communication with each other, the two collinear ports are 'magically' isolated.

The isolation between the E-plane and H-plane ports is wide-band and is as perfect as is the symmetry of the device. The isolation between the collinear ports is however limited by the performance of the matching structure.
