= Star coupler =

A star coupler is a device that takes in an input signal and splits it into several output signals.

In fiber optics, and especially in telecommunications, a star coupler is a passive optical device, used in network applications. An optical signal introduced into any input port is distributed to all output ports. Because of the way a passive star coupler is constructed, the number of ports is usually a power of 2; i.e., two input ports and two output ports (a "two-port" coupler, customarily called a directional coupler, or splitter); four input ports and four output ports (a "four-port" coupler); eight input ports and eight output ports (an "eight-port" coupler), etc.

Digital Equipment Corporation (now part of Hewlett-Packard) of Maynard, Massachusetts sold a star coupler that interconnected links to computers via coaxial cable rather than optical fibres, but the function was essentially the same. The signal that was distributed was 70 Mbit/s computer interconnect (CI) data and the star coupler provided two redundant paths of either 8 or 16 ports each. Digital's star coupler was developed for use with the VAX- and later Alpha-based computers running Digital's OpenVMS operating system, to provide a passive, highly reliable interconnect for Digital's cluster technology.
