= RF switch matrix =

An RF switch matrix is an array of RF switches arranged to route radio frequency (RF) signals between multiple inputs and multiple outputs. Applications requiring RF matrices include ground systems, test equipment, and communication systems.

An RF matrix is used in test systems, in both design verification and manufacturing test, to route high frequency signals between the device under test (DUT) and the test and measurement equipment. In addition to signal routing, the RF/Microwave Switch Matrix may also contain signal conditioning components including passive signal conditioning devices, such as attenuators, filters, and directional couplers, as well as active signal conditioning, such as amplification and frequency converters. Since the signal routing and signal conditioning needs of a test system differ from design to design, RF/Microwave Switch Matrices may be custom designed by the test system engineer or by a hired contractor for each new test system.

The Switch Matrix is made up of discrete electronic components including RF switches and signal conditioners that are mounted together in a mechanical infrastructure or housing. Cables interconnect the switches and signal conditioners. The switch matrix employs a driver circuit and power supply to power and drive the switches and signal conditioners. The switch matrix uses connectors or fixtures to route signals from the sourcing and measurement equipment to the DUT. The switch matrix is typically located close to the DUT to shorten the signal paths, thus reducing insertion loss and signal degradation.

== Matrix benefits ==
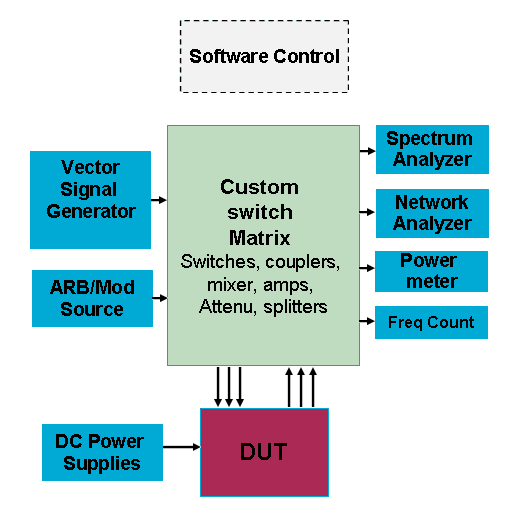
Switch Matrix

The purpose of a switch matrix is to move the signal routing and signal conditioning to one central location in the test system versus having it all distributed at various places in the test system. Moving the signal routing and signal conditioning to a single location in the test system has the following advantages:

- The calibration plane between the DUT and test equipment becomes smaller and more centralized, making it easier to characterize.
- Switches and signal conditioners have similar power, mounting, and driver requirements, so moving them to a single location means only a single power supply and driver circuit is needed to power and control them.
- Short signal paths reduce insertion loss and increase signal integrity.
- Exact-length signal paths are possible, thereby controlling phase issues.
- Simplifies service and support.

== Making it vs buying it ==
Switch matrices present a unique problem to test system designers as the signal conditioning needs, the frequency range, the bandwidth, and power aspects change from application to application. Test and measurement companies cannot provide a "one size fits all" solution. This leaves test system designers with two choices for their switch matrix design: Insourcing or outsourcing.

=== Insource advantages ===
1. Proprietary concerns are a big issue especially in the Aerospace Defense industry. Creating a switch matrix in-house removes this issue.
2. Internal human resources may be less costly.
3. A company is in control of the amount of daily man hours spent in development.
4. Being the first to develop an emerging technology into a finished product can be very profitable. Insourcing bypasses the time spent shopping around for the right contractor.
5. Successive switch matrix designs can be highly leveragable from one design to another. The switch driver hardware and software, the mechanical designs, the power supply, etc. can all be reused in other designs with little or no modification.

=== Outsource advantages ===
1. Only way to obtain device if the company lacks or cannot spare human resources.
2. System integrators (contractors) tend to have more experience and expertise.
3. System integrators can design within tight specs and can handle complicated designs.
4. System integrators can provide guaranteed work and product support.
5. Companies like EECL can design RF switch matrices with best in class performance. A significant amount of free data is available on their website EECL

== Signal routing ==
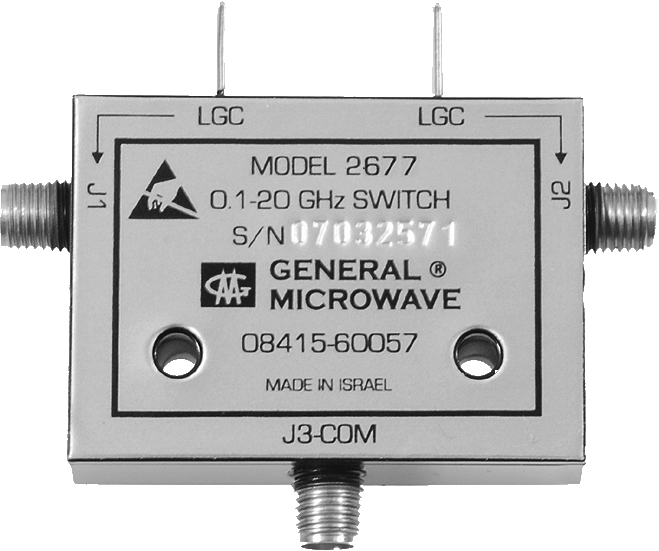
A PIN Diode RF Microwave Switch

There are two types of switches typically used in switch matrices: Coaxial Electromechanical Switches and Solid State Switches, also known as electronic switches. Coaxial electromechanical switches can be further divided into two categories based on their architecture, latching relay and non-latching relay.

Solid state switches come in three types: PIN diode, FET, and hybrid. The advantages of solid state switches over EM switches are:

- They have much faster switching speed (at least 10,000 times faster)
- They have an almost infinite life
- They are very stable and repeatable

On the other hand, since solid state switches have non-linear portions over their frequency range their bandwidth is limited.

An electromechanical switch (EM) provides better:

- insertion loss
- VSWR
- power handling
- isolation specifications.

For these reasons EM switches are used much more often in switch matrix designs.

== Example applications ==
Custom Switch Matrices are used extensively throughout test systems in the wireless and aerospace defense sectors for design verification and for manufacturing test. They have a wide range of complexity, from the simple to the complex.

- An example of a simple design switch matrix application would be a 1:16 MUX configuration that routes 12 satellite TV feeds into a single spectrum analyzer input that performs signal integrity checks on the satellite feeds. Such a design would require 5 Single Pole 4 Throw coaxial EM switches as well as the necessary interconnecting coax cable for the signal routing, along with a mechanical infrastructure, power supply, and switch driver circuit to mount, power, and operate the switches.
- An example of a more complex switch matrix is an application that is measuring jitter on multiple high speed serial data buses. First, the switch matrix receives the data bus signals, then provides the proper switching and signal conditioning for the signals before feeding the signals to the test and measurement instruments. This custom switch matrix would employ 14 EM switches and a number of different signal conditioners including: power splitters, amplifiers, mixers, filters, and attenuators.

RF Switch Matrices are also used heavily in the Television Broadcast market for the reception and re-broadcast of TV Channels. Typically a cable television headend will contain a matrix to enable multiple dishes that are aligned to different satellites to be routed to a bank of receivers. The RF Switch Matrix allows channel changes to be made remotely, without any interruptions.

== Design challenges ==
There are six main challenges when designing a custom RF/Microwave Switch Matrix from beginning to end:

1. Mechanical Design: design of an electrically shielded enclosure or box, internal component mounting brackets, with a component and cabling layout.
2. RF/Microwave Design: a signal routing and signal conditioning design and testing plan. A calibration plan for the switch matrix would need to be developed to properly characterize the signal paths.
3. Power and Control Hardware: The power supply and switch driver circuitry will need to be designed and developed.
4. Software Control: A software driver will need to be developed to provide an interface between the control hardware and test system program.
5. Documentation: The whole switch matrix design needs to be documented to support maintenance and possible future design leveraging.
6. Servicing Plan: A servicing plan needs to be developed to ensure the life of the switch matrix lasts as long as the life of the test system.

Test equipment manufacturers offer instruments that provide a power supply, driver circuitry, and software drivers that essentially saves a test system designer time and cost by eliminating two of the six switch matrix design challenges: power and control hardware design as well as software driver development.

Many companies have introduced new product concepts that aid in custom switch matrix design. These new products offer test system designers a power supply, driver circuitry, and software drivers all wrapped together in a mainframe. The mainframe provides flexible mounting for switches and other components as well as blank front and rear panels that can be easily modified to fit a design need. These new products eliminates 3 of the 6 design challenges: mechanical design, power and control hardware design, and software driver development
