= Rat-race coupler =

Type of radio-frequency coupler

Rat-race coupler

A rat-race coupler, also known as a hybrid ring coupler, is a type of coupler used in RF and microwave systems. In its simplest form, it is a 3 dB coupler and is thus an alternative to a magic tee. Compared to the magic tee, it has the advantage of being easy to realize in planar technologies such as microstrip and stripline, although waveguide rat races are also practical. Unlike magic tees, a rat-race needs no matching structure to achieve correct operation.

The rat-race coupler has four ports, each placed one-quarter wavelength away from each other around the top half of the ring. The bottom half of the ring is three-quarter wavelengths in length. The ring has a characteristic impedance of factor $\sqrt{2}$ compared to port impedance.

A signal input on port 1 will be split between ports 2 and 4, and port 3 will be isolated. The full scattering matrix for an ideal 3 dB rat-race is

$$S = \frac{-i}{\sqrt{2}}
\begin{pmatrix}
0 & 1 & 0 & -1 \\
1 & 0 & 1 &  0 \\
0 & 1 & 0 &  1 \\
-1 & 0 & 1 &  0
\end{pmatrix}$$

Arithmetics with rat-race coupler

Rat-race couplers are used to sum two in-phase combined signals with essentially no loss or to equally split an input signal with no resultant phase difference between its outputs. It is also possible to configure the coupler as a 180 degree phase-shifted output divider or to sum two 180 degree phase-shifted combined signals with almost no loss.
