= Butler matrix =

Type of beamforming network

A Butler matrix is a beamforming network used to feed a phased array of antenna elements. Its purpose is to control the direction of a beam, or beams, of radio transmission. It consists of an $n \times n$ matrix ($n$ some power of two) with hybrid couplers and fixed-value phase shifters at the junctions. The device has $n$ input ports (the beam ports) to which power is applied, and $n$ output ports (the element ports) to which $n$ antenna elements are connected. The Butler matrix feeds power to the elements with a progressive phase difference between elements such that the beam of radio transmission is in the desired direction. The beam direction is controlled by switching power to the desired beam port. More than one beam, or even all $n$ of them can be activated simultaneously.

The concept was first proposed by Butler and Lowe in 1961. It is a development of the work of Blass in 1960. Its advantage over other methods of angular beamforming is the simplicity of the hardware. It requires far fewer phase shifters than other methods and can be implemented in microstrip on a low-cost printed circuit board.

== Antenna elements ==
The antenna elements fed by a Butler matrix are typically horn antennae at the microwave frequencies at which Butler matrices are usually used. Horns have limited bandwidth and more complex antennas may be used if more than an octave is required. The elements are commonly arranged in a linear array. A Butler matrix can also feed a circular array giving 360° coverage. A further application with a circular antenna array is to produce $n$ omnidirectional beams with orthogonal phase-modes so that multiple mobile stations can all simultaneously use the same frequency, each using a different phase-mode. A circular antenna array can be made to simultaneously produce an omnidirectional beam and multiple directional beams when fed through two Butler matrices back-to-back.

Butler matrices can be used with both transmitters and receivers. Since they are passive and reciprocal, the same matrix can do both – in a transceiver for instance. They have the advantageous property that in transmit mode they deliver the full power of the transmitter to the beam, and in receive mode they collect signals from each of the beam directions with the full gain of the antenna array.

== Components ==
The essential components needed to build a Butler matrix are hybrid couplers and fixed-value phase shifters. Additionally, fine control of the beam direction can be provided with variable phase shifters in addition to the fixed phase shifters. By using the variable phase shifters in combination with switching the power to the beam ports, a continuous sweep of the beam can be produced.

An additional component that can be used is a planar crossover distributed-element circuit. Microwave circuits are often manufactured in the planar format called microstrip. Lines that need to cross over each other are typically implemented as an air bridge. These are unsuitable for this application because there is unavoidably some coupling between the lines being crossed. An alternative which allows the Butler matrix to be implemented entirely in printed circuit form, and thus more economically, is a crossover in the form of a branch-line coupler. The crossover coupler is equivalent to two 90° hybrid couplers connected in cascade. This will add an additional 90° phase shift to the lines being crossed, but this can be compensated for by adding an equivalent amount to the phase shifters in lines not being crossed. An ideal branch-line crossover theoretically has no coupling between the two paths through it. In this kind of implementation, the phase shifters are constructed as delay lines of the appropriate length. This is just a meandering line on the printed circuit.

Microstrip is cheap, but is not suitable for all applications. When there are a large number of antenna elements, the path through the Butler matrix goes through a large number of hybrids and phase shifters. The cumulative insertion loss from all these components in microstrip can make it impractical. The technology usually used to overcome this problem, especially at the higher frequencies, is waveguide which is much less lossy. Not only is this more expensive, it is also much more bulky and heavier, which is a major drawback for aircraft use. Another choice that is less bulky, but still less lossy than microstrip, is substrate-integrated waveguide.

== Applications ==
A typical use of Butler matrices is in the base stations of mobile networks to keep the beams pointing towards the mobile users.

Linear antenna arrays driven by Butler matrices, or some other beam-forming network, to produce a scanning beam are used in direction finding applications. They are important for military warning systems and target location. They are especially useful in naval systems because of the wide angular coverage that can be obtained. Another feature that makes Butler matrices attractive for military applications is their speed over mechanical scanning systems. These need to allow settling time for the servos.

== Examples ==
=== 2x2 matrix ===
2×2 matrix schematic

Beam pattern produced by a 2x2 matrix

=== 4×4 matrix ===
4×4 matrix schematic

Beam pattern produced by a 4x4 matrix

==== Implementation in microstrip ====
A 2.4 GHz 4×4 Butler matrix in microstrip

Identification of circuit blocks in the 4×4 matrix

=== 8×8 matrix ===
8×8 matrix schematic

Beam pattern produced by an 8x8 matrix

== Analysis ==
A linear antenna array will produce a beam perpendicular to the line of elements (broadside beam) if they are all fed in phase. If they are fed with a phase change between elements of

$$2 \pi d \over \lambda$$

then a beam in the direction of the line (endfire beam) will be produced. Using an intermediate value of phase shift between elements will produce a beam at some angle intermediate between these two extremes. In a Butler matrix, the phase shift of each beam is made

$$\phi = \frac {(2k-1) \pi}{n} \ ,$$

and the angle between the outer beams is given by

$$\theta = 2 \arcsin \left[ \frac{c}{2df} \left ( 1 - {1 \over n} \right ) \right ] \ .$$

The expression shows that $\theta$ decreases with increasing frequency. This effect is called beam squint. Both the Blass matrix and Butler matrix suffer from beam squint and the effect limits the bandwidth that can be achieved. Another undesirable effect is that the further a beam is off boresight (broadside beam) the lower is the beam peak field.

The total number of circuit blocks required is

${n \over 2} \log_2 n$ hybrids and,
${n \over 2} (\log_2n - 1)$ fixed phase shifters.

Since $n$ is always a power of 2, we can let $n=2^m$, then the required number of hybrids is $2^{m-1}m$ and phase shifters $2^{m-1}(m-1)$.

Symbols used
$n$ number of antenna elements, equal to number of beam ports
$d$ distance between antenna elements
$k$ index number of antenna port
$\lambda$ wavelength
$f$ frequency
$\phi$ phase shift
$\theta$ angle
$c$ speed of light

=== Orthogonality ===
To be orthogonal (that is, not interfere with each other) the beam shapes must meet the Nyquist ISI criterion, but with distance as the independent variable rather than time. Assuming a sinc function beam shape, the beams must be spaced so that their crossovers occur at $2/\pi$ of their peak value (about 4 dB down).

== See also ==
- RF switch

== Bibliography ==
- Balanis, Constantine A.; Ioannides, Panayiotis I., Introduction to Smart Antennas, Morgan & Claypool, 2007 ISBN 9781598291766.
- Blass, J., "Multidirectional antenna - a new approach to stacked beams", 1958 IRE International Convention Record, 1966.
- Butler, J.; Lowe, R., "Beam forming matrix simplifiers design of electrically scanned antennas", Electronic Design, 1961.
- Comitangelo, R.; Minervini, D.; Piovano, B., "Beam forming networks of optimum size and compactness for multibeam antennas at 900 MHz", IEEE Antennas and Propagation Society International Symposium 1997, vol. 4, pp. 2127-2130, 1997.
- Fujimoto, Kyohei, Mobile Antenna Systems Handbook, Artech House, 2008 ISBN 9781596931275.
- Haupt, Randy L., Timed Arrays: Wideband and Time Varying Antenna Arrays, Wiley, 2015 ISBN 9781118860144.
- Innok, Apinya; Uthansakul, Peerapong; Uthansakul, Monthippa, "Angular beamforming technique for MIMO beamforming system", International Journal of Antennas and Propagation, vol. 2012, iss. 11, December 2012.
- Josefsson, Lars; Persson, Patrik, Conformal Array Antenna Theory and Design, Wiley, 2006 ISBN 9780471780113.
- Lipsky, Stephen E., Microwave Passive Direction Finding, SciTech Publishing, 2004 ISBN 9781891121234.
- Milligan, Thomas A., Modern Antenna Design, Wiley, 2005 ISBN 9780471720607.
- Poisel, Richard, Electronic Warfare Target Location Methods, Artech House, 2012 ISBN 9781608075232.
- Sturdivant, Rick; Harris, Mike, Transmit Receive Modules for Radar and Communication Systems, Artech House, 2015 ISBN 9781608079803.
- Tzyh-Ghuang Ma, Chao-Wei Wang, Chi-Hui Lai, Ying-Cheng Tseng, Synthesized Transmission Lines, Wiley, 2017 ISBN 9781118975725.
