= Fred Judd =

British inventor, amateur radio operator (1914–1992)

- Judd in 1961 at a Centre of Sound concert, London
- Born: Frederick Charles Judd; 5 June 1914; St. Pancras, England
- Died: April 1992 (aged 77); Norwich, England
- Other names: F.C. Judd
- Occupations: Inventor; amateur radio operator
- Known for: design of Slim Jim and ZL Special antennas
- Call sign: G2BCX

Frederick Charles Judd (5 June 1914 – April 1992) was a British inventor, amateur radio operator, and proselytiser of early British electronic music.

== Early career ==
Like fellow composer Tristram Cary, Judd served in the forces during World War II, working with radar and becoming a fully trained engineer. After demobilisation he worked for the company Kelvin Hughes on the research and development of marine radar apparatus, while writing articles for hobbyist magazines on radio and remote controlled models. The first of his 11 published books was issued in 1954, and with the launch of Amateur Tape Recording (ATR) magazine in 1959, he soon joined the staff as technical editor, writing about all manner of topics connected to tape, electronics and hi-fi.

== Electronic music ==
Along with Daphne Oram, Judd was enthusiastically promoting electronic music to the British public via demonstrations and lectures to amateur tape recording clubs up and down the country. In 1961 his book Electronic Music and Musique Concrete was published – one of the earliest in the world to tackle the subject and provide practical information and circuit diagrams. Two years later he became chief editor of ATR and began issuing 7” records made available through the magazine. Castle and sister label Contrast issued a range of sound effects discs recorded by Judd, including 3 disks of electronic music. Some of these tracks were later issued by library label Studio G on the Electronic Age album.

By the start of 1963 Judd had designed and built his own prototype synthesizer – a simple voltage controlled, keyboard-operated unit for generating, shaping and switching electronic sounds – a small but significant development in the history of the synthesizer, as it predates the Synket, Moog and Buchla instruments.

Broadcast in 1963 on the ITV network, the sci-fi puppet show Space Patrol was the first on British television to feature a specially composed electronic music soundtrack running throughout the series. Judd created the sounds with tape manipulation, loops and tone generators in his home studio in London.

Judd's investigations into the visualisation of electronic sounds led to his system Chromasonics. This was a modified b&w television to which he added new pulse generating and amplifying circuitry, along with a high speed colour scanning wheel in front of the screen. This apparatus yielded full colour abstract patterns moving in accordance with the sound input from oscillators or tape recordings. Chromasonics was demonstrated to great acclaim at the 1963 Audio Fair in London, but interest from electronics firm Stuzzi did not lead to commercial development.

== Later career and legacy ==
Judd was an amateur radio enthusiast with his call sign G2BCX, and his innovative designs for the Slim Jim and ZL Special aerial antennas are still in use today. From the late 1970s, he operated from his home in Cantley, Norfolk. Towards the end of his life, he built several detailed reconstructions of early electrical devices including a Wimshurst machine and Edison phonograph. He was honoured by the University of East Anglia for constructing a working replica of apparatus used by Heinrich Hertz, but it seems that none of this equipment, the Chromasonics apparatus or his experimental music-making machinery has survived. However, starting in 2010 all of his remaining original quarter inch tapes have been catalogued and deposited with the British Library Sound Archive.

In 2011, Judd was the focus of Practical Electronica, an experimental documentary by Ian Helliwell, covering Judd's work with electronic sound and amateur tape recording. A retrospective album gathering together as much of his experimental music as can be located, is being released by the Public Information label. Judd was a regular contributor to Practical Wireless magazine.

== Books ==
- Radio control for model ships, boats and aircraft. London: Data publications, 1954.
- Electronic music and musique concrète. London: N. Spearman, 1961.
- Tape recording for everyone. Blackie, 1962.
- Radio and electronic hobbies. London: Museum Press, 1963.
- Circuits for audio and tape recording. Haymarket Press, 1966.
- Electronics in music. London: Spearman, 1972.
- Amateur radio. Newnes Technical Books, 1980.
- Two-metre antenna handbook. Newnes Technical, 1980.
- CB radio. Newnes Technical, 1982.
- Radio wave propagation : (HF bands). London : Heinemann, 1987.
