= Two-tone testing =

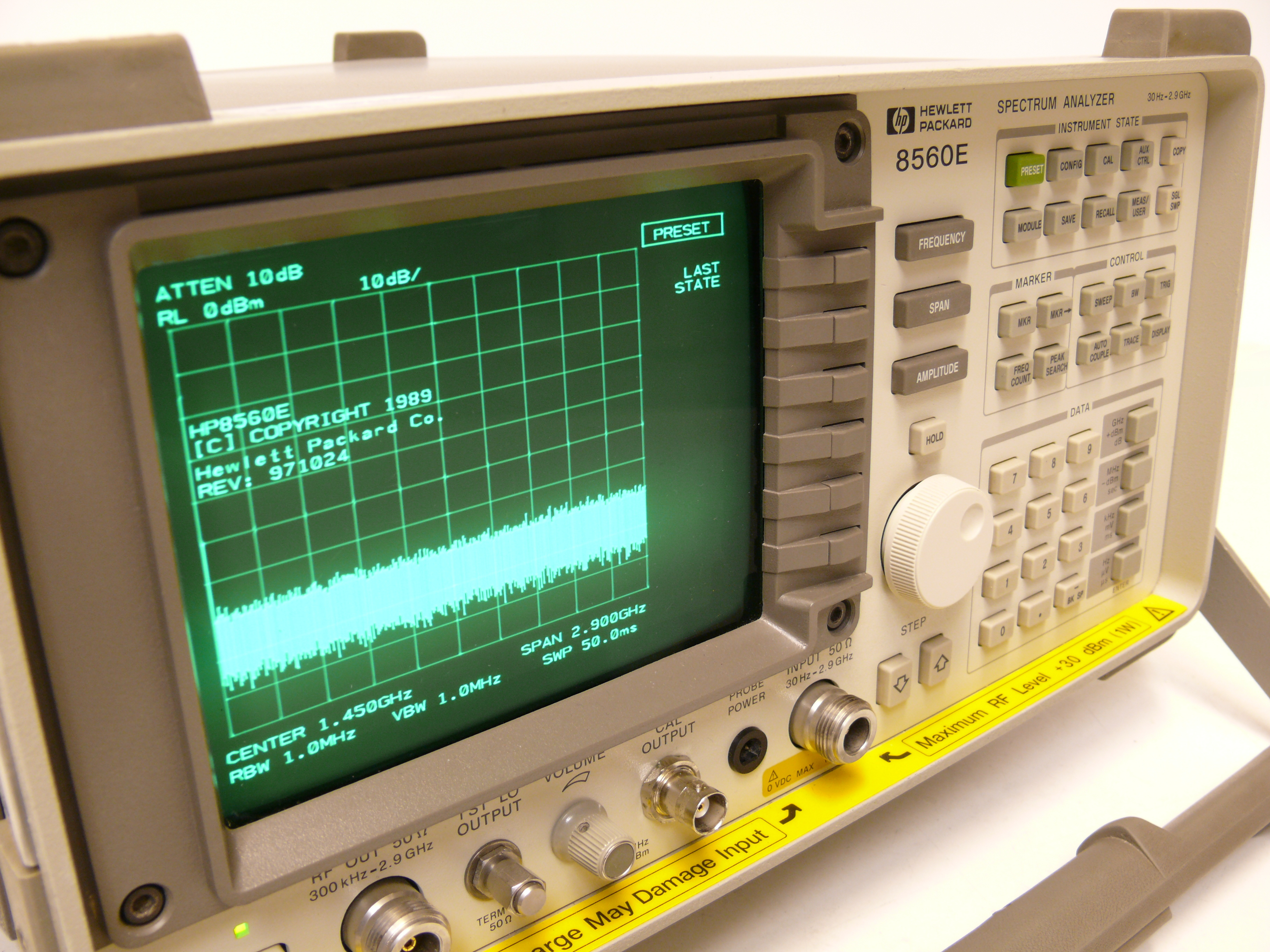
A spectrum analyser – typically used as the measuring instrument in two-tone testing

Two-tone testing is a means of testing electronic components and systems, particularly radio systems, for intermodulation distortion. It consists of simultaneously injecting two sinusoidal signals of different frequencies (tones) into the component or system. Intermodulation distortion usually occurs in active components like amplifiers, but can also occur in some circumstances in passive items such as cable connectors, especially at high power.

Measurement in two-tone testing is most commonly done by examining the output of the device under test (DUT) with a spectrum analyser with which intermodulation products can be directly observed. Sometimes this is not possible with complete systems and instead the consequences of intermodulation are observed. For instance, in a radar system the result of intermodulation might be the generation of false targets.

== Rationale ==
An electronic device can be tested by applying a single frequency to its input and measuring the response at its output. If there is any non-linearity in the device, this will cause harmonic distortion at the output. This kind of distortion consists of whole-number multiples of the applied signal frequency, as well as the original frequency being present at the device output. Intermodulation distortion can produce outputs at other frequencies. The new frequencies created by intermodulation are the sum and difference of the injected frequencies and the harmonics of these. Intermodulation effects cannot be detected with single-tone testing, but they may be just as, or more undesirable than harmonic distortion depending on their frequency and level.

Two-tone testing can also be used to determine the discrimination of a radio receiver. That is, the ability of the receiver to distinguish between transmissions close in frequency.

== Testing ==
General test setup for two-tone testing

=== Component testing ===
Circuit components such as amplifiers can be tested using the two-tone method with a test setup like that shown in the figure. Two signal generators, set to two different frequencies F1 and F2, are fed into a power combiner through circulators. The combiner needs to have good isolation to prevent the signal from one generator being sent to the output of the other. If this happens, intermodulation can occur in the non-linear parts of the generator internal circuit. The resulting intermodulation products will give a false result to the test. The circulators are there to provide even more isolation between the generators and isolation between any signal that might get reflected back from the device under test (DUT) and the generator. The circulators have one port connected to a resistive load so that they act as isolators. Low-pass filters may also be provided at the generator outputs to remove any harmonic distortion. These harmonics could cause unexpected intermodulation products in the DUT, again giving misleading results. The output of the DUT is fed to a spectrum analyser where the results are observed, possibly via an attenuator to reduce the signal to a level the instrument can cope with.

==== Passive components ====
Passive components such as cables, connectors and antennas, are generally expected to be linear and therefore not liable to generate any intermodulation. However, especially at high power, a number of effects can lead to non-linearity through formation of a metal–semiconductor junction at what is supposed to be a metal-metal junction. These effects include corrosion, surface oxidisation, dirtiness, and simple failure to fully make mechanical contact. Some passive materials are intrinsically non-linear. These include ferrites, ferrous metals, and carbon-fibre composites.

Intermodulation distortion is a particularly difficult problem at the cellular base stations of mobile phone cellular networks. These have to deal with multiple transmissions at closely spaced frequencies and it is necessary to ensure that these do not interact with each other. A typical specification is that intermodulation products should not exceed −125 dBm in the presence of 40 dbm transmissions. This equates to a requirement for a signal to intermodulation ratio of 165 dB, an exceedingly stringent specification. To achieve this, materials and components must be chosen with great care and installation and maintenance done to a high standard. Likewise, two-tone testing of these components needs to be done with great care and precision since intermodulation products at these low levels can easily be generated within the test setup accidentally.

There is an international standard, IEC 62037 "Passive RF and microwave devices, intermodulation level measurement", for measuring intermodulation distortion of passive components. Testing to the standard ensures that specifications from different manufacturers are done under the same conditions and can be compared with each other. Militaries will typically use their own standards for testing. For instance US procurement contracts may specify MIL-STD-461.

=== Receiver testing ===
Two-tone receiver testing using direct injection

Two-tone receiver testing using off-air method

A test setup suitable for testing receivers at microwave frequencies is shown in the figure. The two signal generators, F1 and F2, are combined using a directional coupler in reverse. That is, the two generators are connected to what would normally be the coupled and transmitted output ports respectively. The combined signal appears at what would normally be the input port. The advantage of using a directional coupler rather than a simple summing circuit is that the directional coupler provides isolation between the two generators. As with the component testing, another signal being injected into the output of a signal generator can cause intermodulation distortion within the generator. Isolators are included in the test set up as with the component testing.

The combined test signal can be injected directly in to the receiver if the antenna is removable. A second directional coupler, connected in the conventional configuration, can be used to provide a feed of the input to a spectrum analyser. This allows confirmation that the input signal is free of intermodulation products. If the test signal cannot be directly injected, for instance, because the receiver uses an active antenna, then the test signal is transmitted through its own transmitting antenna. A feed for a spectrum analyser can be provided by connecting a receiving antenna to its input. Tests done by the latter method are normally performed in an anechoic chamber to avoid broadcasting the test signal to the world at large.

The consequences of intermodulation distortion depend on the nature and purpose of the receiver. For a set receiving audio, it can manifest itself as an interfering signal making the wanted station unintelligible. In a radar receiver, it can manifest as a false detection of a target.

=== Transmitter testing ===
For transmitters that are designed for the transmission of speech or music, two frequencies within the audio band can be injected into the normal input of the transmitter. The output of the transmitter can be examined with a spectrum analyzer to look for intermodulation products. This kind of end-to-end testing tests all parts of the transmitter for non-linearity: from the audio stage, through the mixing and IF amplifier, to the final RF power amplifier. Likewise, a transmitter used for passing data can be injected with two frequencies within the baseband of the data stream. In some cases, there is no accessible input to a transmitter. Radar transmitters, for instance, do not take an input; the circuitry generating the radar signal is internal to the transmitter. In such cases the tones must be injected at some internal point of the device, or else the amplifiers and other stages must be tested as separate components. A dummy load may be connected to the output of the transmitter to prevent it actually broadcasting, and a directional coupler, possibly together with an attenuator, used to provide a feed to the spectrum analyser.

The spacing in frequency between the two tones is of some significance in transmitter testing. The spacing determines whether intermodulation products are going to be in-band or out-of-band. That is, whether or not they occur within the band that the transmitter is designed to operate. In-band intermodulation is problematic because it interferes with the operation of the transmitter. However, out-of-band intermodulation can be an even greater problem. In most countries the telecommunications authority licenses the operator to use specific frequencies. Out-of-band signals are required to be virtually suppressed altogether. However, the greater frequency difference between the wanted and unwanted signal makes out-of-band intermodulation products relatively easy to remove with filters.

Just as two tones provide a more realistic test than a single tone, multi-tone testing can be used to even better simulate the behaviour of a real signal. The idea is to spread the tones over the bandwidth of the real signal with a similar frequency power density. For accurate results, it is important that the phase of the tones relative to each other is considered. It is usually undesirable that the tones are in a synchronised phase relationship as this can give misleading results. For this reason, it is often endeavoured to generate tones with random phases in multi-tone testing.

== Bibliography ==
- Avionics Department, Electronic Warfare and Radar Systems Engineering Handbook 4th edition, Naval Air Warfare Center Weapons Division, October 2013, NACWD Tech. Pub. 8347.
- Carr, Joseph J., Practical Radio Frequency Test and Measurement, Newnes, 1999 ISBN 0750671610.
- Linkhart, Douglas K., Microwave Circulator Design, Artech House, 2014 ISBN 1608075834.
- Pedro, José Carlos; Carvalho, Nuno Borges, Intermodulation Distortion in Microwave and Wireless Circuits, Artech House, 2003 ISBN 1580536913.
- Pozar, David M., Microwave Engineering, John Wiley & Sons, 2011 ISBN 0470631554.
- Rudersdorfer, Ralf, Behavioral Modeling and Predistortion of Wideband Wireless Transmitters, John Wiley & Sons, 2015 ISBN 1118406273.
- Zhang, Xuejun; Larson, Lawrence E.; Asbeck, Peter, Design of Linear RF Outphasing Power Amplifiers, Artech House, 2003 ISBN 1580536123.
