= Wilkinson power divider =

Power circuit in microwave engineering

Power divider in microstrip technology

In the field of microwave engineering and circuit design, the Wilkinson Power Divider is a specific class of power divider circuit that can achieve isolation between the output ports while maintaining a matched condition on all ports. The Wilkinson design can also be used as a power combiner because it is made up of passive components and hence is reciprocal. First published by Ernest J. Wilkinson in 1960, this circuit finds wide use in radio frequency communication systems utilizing multiple channels since the high degree of isolation between the output ports prevents crosstalk between the individual channels.

It uses quarter wave transformers, which can be easily fabricated as quarter wave lines on printed circuit boards. It is also possible to use other forms of transmission line (e.g. coaxial cable) or lumped circuit elements (inductors and capacitors).

== Theory ==
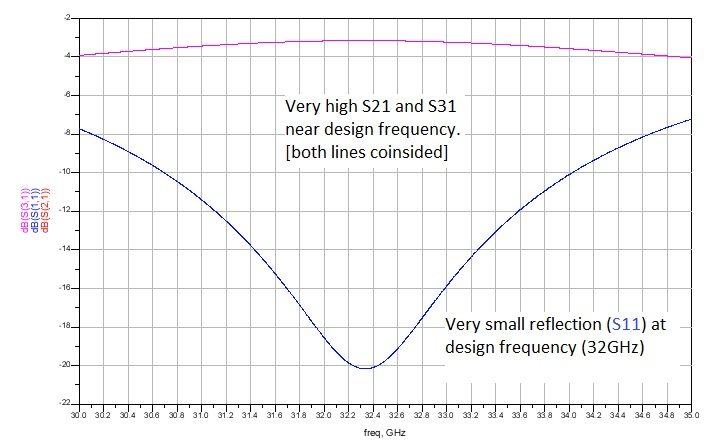
Picture shows a typical output expected from a Wilkinson power divider. The $S_{21}, S_{31}$ are almost -3 dB, and the $S_{11}$ is low near the design frequency.

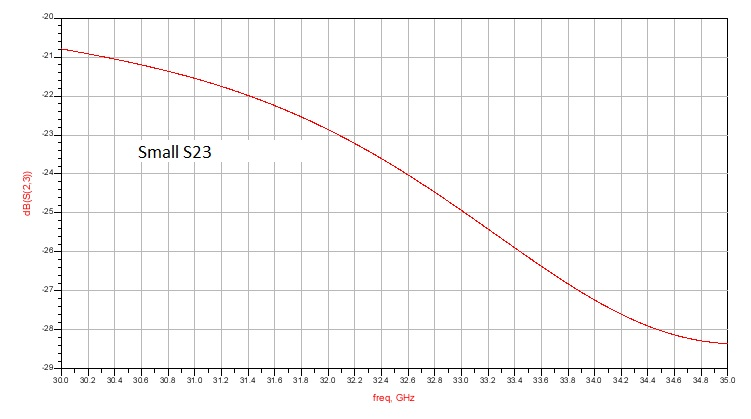
Picture demonstrates a very high isolation between output ports (port 2 & 3) of a Wilkinson power divider

The scattering parameters for the common case of a 2-way equal-split Wilkinson power divider at the design frequency is given by

$$[S]=\frac{-j}{\sqrt{2}}\begin{bmatrix}
0 & 1 & 1 \\
1 & 0 & 0 \\
1 & 0 & 0 \\
\end{bmatrix}$$

Inspection of the S matrix reveals that the network is reciprocal ($S_{ij}=S_{ji}$), that the terminals are matched ($S_{11}, S_{22}, S_{33}=0$), that the output terminals are isolated ($S_{23}, S_{32}$=0), and that equal power division is achieved ($S_{21}=S_{31}$). The non-unitary matrix results from the fact that the network is lossy. An ideal Wilkinson divider would yield $S_{21}=S_{31} = -3\,\text{dB} =20\log_{10} (\frac{1}{\sqrt{2}})$.

Network theorem governs that a divider cannot satisfy all three conditions (being matched, reciprocal and loss-less) at the same time. Wilkinson divider satisfies the first two (matched and reciprocal), and cannot satisfy the last one (being loss-less). Hence, there is some loss occurring in the network.

No loss occurs when the signals at ports 2 and 3 are in phase and have equal magnitude. In case of noise input to ports 2 and 3, the noise level at port 1 does not increase, half of the noise power is dissipated in the resistor.

By cascading, the input power might be divided to any $n$-number of outputs.

Unequal/Asymmetric Division Through Wilkinson Divider

If the arms for port 2 and 3 are connected with un-equal impedances, then asymmetric division of power can be achieved. When characteristic impedance is $Z_{0}$, and one wants to split power as $P_{2}$ and $P_{3}$, and $P_{2}$ ≠ $P_{3}$, then the design can be created following the equations:

A new constant $K$ is defined for ease of expression, where $K^{2}= \frac{P_{3}}{P_{2}}$

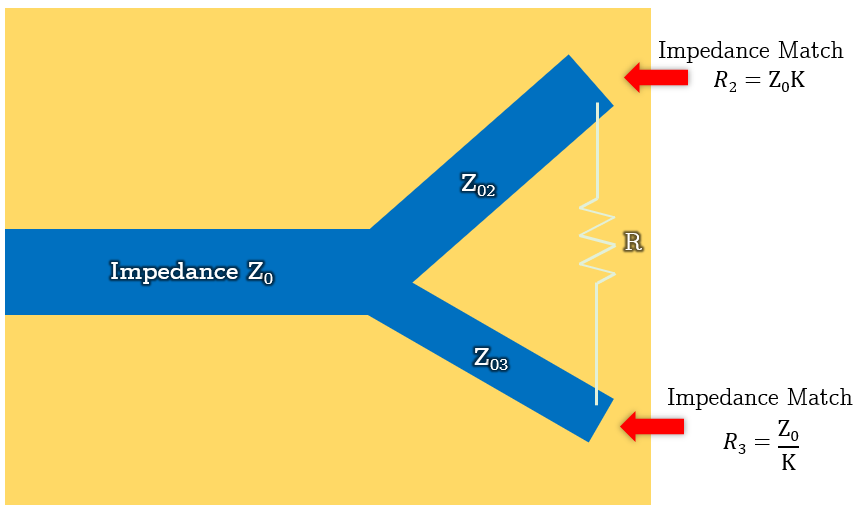
Impedances are different in two branches to achieve unequal splitting of power. The output impedances of the two branches are also different.

Then the design guideline is:
$Z_{03} =Z_{0} \sqrt{\frac{1+K^2}{K^3}}$
$Z_{02} =Z_{0} \sqrt{K(1+K^2)} = K^2 Z_{03}$

$R =Z_{0} (K+\frac{1}{K})$

The equal-splitting Wilkinson Divider is obtained for $K=1$.

== See also ==
- Power dividers and directional couplers
