= Ernest Berdoe Wilkinson =

Brigadier-General Ernest Berdoe Wilkinson
- Born: 10 March 1864; Castleknock, County Dublin, Ireland
- Died: 11 April 1946 (aged 82) Bramley, Surrey, England

Brigadier-General Ernest Berdoe Wilkinson (10 March 1864 – 11 April 1946) was a British Army officer who after service in Asia and Africa commanded a brigade on the Western Front in the First World War.

== Life ==
Born on 10 March 1864 in Castleknock, Ireland, he was the fourth son of Lieutenant-Colonel Berdoe Amherst Wilkinson (1827-1895) and his wife Frances Neale (1830-1891).

After initially serving in the militia, in 1885 he was commissioned in the regular army as a lieutenant with the Lincolnshire Regiment. Following service in Burma, in 1897 he was attached to the Egyptian Army and served in Sudan, being rewarded in 1900 with the Egyptian Order of the Medjidie and promotion to brevet major. In 1907, as a full major aged 43, he retired and took the post of Director of Agriculture and Forests for Sudan.

With the outbreak of the First World War in 1914, he was recalled to service and given command of the 8th (Service) Battalion of the Lincolnshire Regiment. On 3 September 1915, he was promoted to head the 62nd Brigade, which was sent into the bloody Battle of Loos. He survived, but in 1916 was replaced and sent back to the Remount Department in the UK. In 1917 he was awarded the Egyptian Order of the Nile.

He died on 11 April 1946 in Bramley, Surrey, at the age of 82.

== Family ==
On 17 June 1905, in Folkestone, Kent, he married Harriet Emma Eccles (1863-1925). No children are known. He was the uncle of Dermot William Berdoe-Wilkinson (1882-1955), his executor, who served as High Sheriff of Surrey.
