= E-plane and H-plane =

Convention in engineering geometry

The E-plane and H-plane are reference planes for linearly polarized waveguides, antennas and other microwave devices.

In waveguide systems, as in the electric circuits, it is often desirable to be able to split the circuit power into two or more fractions. In a waveguide system, an element called a junction is used for power division.

In a low frequency electrical network, it is possible to combine circuit elements in series or in parallel, thereby dividing the source power among several circuit components. In microwave circuits, a waveguide with three independent ports is called a TEE junction. The output of E-Plane Tee is 180° out of phase where the output of H-plane Tee is in phase.

== E-Plane ==
For a linearly-polarized antenna, this is the plane containing the electric field vector (sometimes called the E aperture) and the direction of maximum radiation. The electric field or "E" plane determines the polarization or orientation of the radio wave. For a vertically polarized antenna, the E-plane usually coincides with the vertical/elevation plane. For a horizontally polarized antenna, the E-Plane usually coincides with the horizontal/azimuth plane. E- plane and H-plane should be 90 degrees apart.

== H-plane ==
In the case of the same linearly polarized antenna, this is the plane containing the magnetic field vector (sometimes called the H aperture) and the direction of maximum radiation. The magnetizing field or "H" plane lies at a right angle to the "E" plane. For a vertically polarized antenna, the H-plane usually coincides with the horizontal/azimuth plane. For a horizontally polarized antenna, the H-plane usually coincides with the vertical/elevation plane.

== Illustrations ==
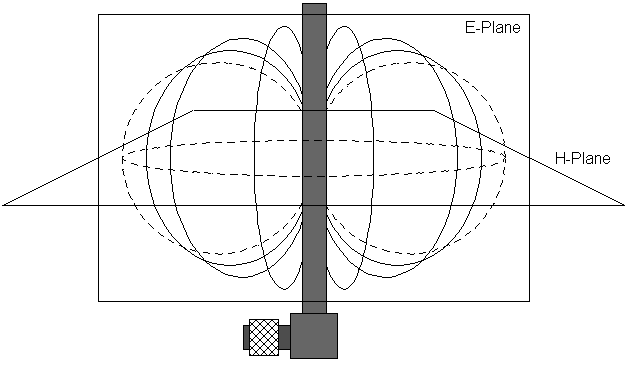
Diagram showing the relationship between the E and H planes for a vertically polarized omnidirectional dipole antenna

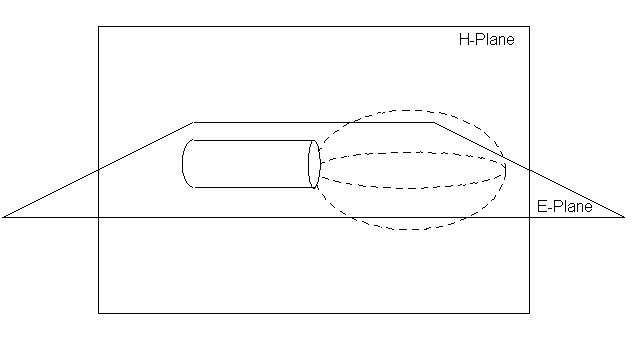
Diagram showing the relationship between the E and H planes for a horizontally polarized directional yagi antenna

== Co- and cross-polarizations ==
Co-polarization (co-pol) and cross-polarization (cross-pol) are defined for the radiating E and H planes. These directions are defined in spherical coordinates corresponding to the spherical wavefronts of the propagating wave. By convention, the co-pol direction is the direction of the E field while the cross-pol direction is the direction of the H field. Receive power for a co-pol oriented antenna is maximum while receive power is minimum for cross-pol orientation.

== See also ==
- Polarization plane
- Radiation pattern
