= IP =

IP most often refers to:

- Intellectual property, creations of the mind for which exclusive legal rights are recognized
- Internet Protocol, a set of rules for sending data across a network
- IP address, a numerical label assigned to each device connected to a computer network

IP, Ip, or ip may also refer to:

== Businesses and organizations ==
- IP College (Indraprastha College for Women), a constituent college of the University of Delhi, New Delhi, India
- Imperial Police, a former Indian police agency
- Indische Party
- Inicjatywa Pracownicza (Workers' Initiative), a Polish trade union
- International Paper, an American pulp and paper company
- Iraqi Police
- Atyrau Airways (IATA code: IP)
- Italiana Petroli, an Italian petroleum brand owned by Anonima Petroli Italiana
- Información Periodística, the former name of Argentine television news channel Argentina/12

== Places ==
- Ipswich, for Ipswich and surrounding areas, England
- Ip, Sălaj, Romania
- Ip (river), a river in Sălaj County, Romania
- IP Casino Resort Spa, in Biloxi, Mississippi, US

== Science and technology ==
=== Biology and medicine ===
- Immunoprecipitation, a molecular biology technique
- Incontinentia pigmenti, a genetic disorder
- Infundibulopelvic ligament, part of the female pelvis
- Interphalangeal joint (disambiguation)
- Interventional pulmonology, a less invasive lung treatment than surgery
- Intestinal permeability
- Intraperitoneal injection (IP injection), the injection of a substance into the peritoneum
- Prostacyclin receptor (symbol PTGIR, older synonym IP)

=== Computing ===
- IP (complexity), a class in computational complexity theory
- IP core (intellectual property core), a reusable design unit owned by one party
- Instruction pointer, a processor register
- Intelligent Peripheral, a part of a public telecommunications Intelligent Network
- Image processing
- ip, a Linux command in the iproute2 collection

=== Other science and technology ===
- IP code (Ingress Protection code), an equipment protection classification scheme
- Identified patient, a psychology term
- Identity preserved, an agricultural designation
- Induced polarization, a geophysical imaging technique
- Intercept point, a measure in amplifiers and mixers
- Ion plating, a chemical process

== Law and government ==
- Indian Preference, employment practices giving priority in hiring to American Indians
- Inspector of Police, a rank in police forces of India.
- Industrial property, similar to intellectual property but including trademarks and excluding artistic copyright
- Insolvency practitioner, a legal specialist
- Industrial policy, a country's effort to encourage the development of certain sectors of the economy
- Integrated project (EU), a type of research project
- Immunity passport
- I/P, sometimes used as shorthand for the Israeli–Palestinian conflict

== Other uses ==
- Ip (cuneiform)
- Ip (surname)
- Inflectional phrase, a functional phrase that has inflectional properties
- Innings pitched, a baseball statistic
- Integrated Programme, an academic scheme in Singapore
- Internationale Politik, a German political journal
- Item and Process, a linguistic method to describe phenomena of allomorphy
- In plane switching

== See also ==
- IP in IP, an IP tunneling protocol
- List of IP version numbers
- Ip Man (disambiguation)
- IP3 (disambiguation)
- IP5 (disambiguation)
- Independence Party (disambiguation)
- Independent Party (disambiguation)
