= Compression point =

Characteristic of an electronic amplifier

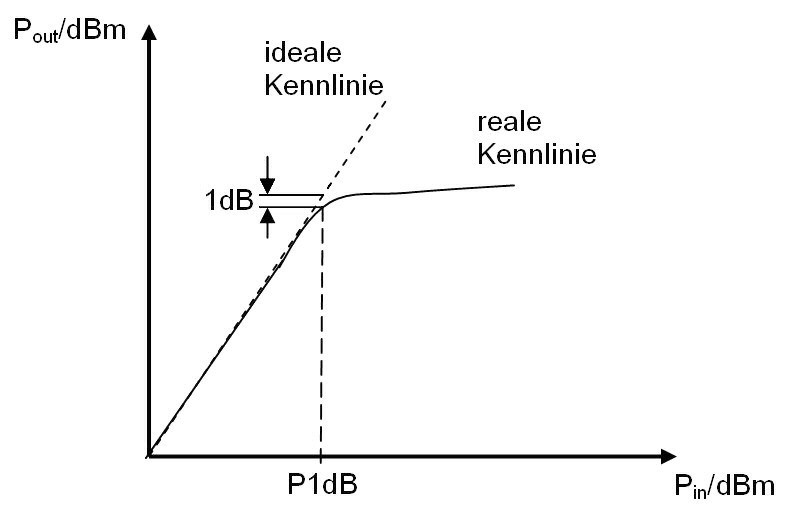
1 dB compression point (P1dB) on a graph of the transfer function (in German). An ideal amplifier will produce a straight line (German: ideale Kennlinie). A real-world amplifier has an output power limit and will therefore exhibit gain compression (German: reale Kennlinie)

The compression point is a metric describing an aspect of electronic amplifiers. For example, the 1-dB compression point (sometimes notated as P1dB) is the output power of the amplifier (for the signal of interest) at which it differs from an ideal linear amplifier by more than 1 dB. So a larger 1-dB compression point means that the amplifier can produce larger outputs (for the same amount of distortion). It will often be quoted by manufacturers of amplifiers.

The compression point is sometimes used (interchangeably with the third-order intercept point) to define the upper limit of the dynamic range of an amplifier. A rule of thumb that holds for many linear radio-frequency amplifiers is that the 1 dB compression point point falls approximately 10 dB below the third-order intercept point.
