= Adjacent-channel interference =

Interference caused by a signal in an adjacent channel

Adjacent-channel interference (ACI) is interference caused by extraneous power from a signal in an adjacent channel. ACI may be caused by inadequate filtering (such as incomplete filtering of unwanted modulation products in FM systems), improper tuning or poor frequency control (in the reference channel, the interfering channel or both).

ACI is distinguished from crosstalk.

== Origin ==
The adjacent-channel interference which receiver A experiences from a transmitter B is the sum of the power that B emits into A's channel—known as the "unwanted emission", and represented by the ACLR (Adjacent Channel Leakage Ratio)—and the power that A picks up from B's channel, which is represented by the ACS (Adjacent Channel Selectivity). B emitting power into A's channel is called adjacent-channel leakage (unwanted emissions). It occurs for two reasons. First, because RF filters require a roll-off, and do not eliminate a signal completely. Second, due to intermodulation in B's amplifiers, which cause the transmitted spectrum to spread beyond what was intended. Therefore, B emits some power in the adjacent channel which is picked up by A. A receives some emissions from B's channel due to the roll off of A's selectivity filters. Selectivity filters are designed to "select" a channel. Similarly, B's signal suffers intermodulation distortion passing through A's RF input amplifiers, leaking more power into adjacent frequencies.

== Avoidance procedure ==
Broadcast regulators frequently manage the broadcast spectrum in order to minimize adjacent-channel interference. For example, in North America, FM radio stations in a single region cannot be licensed on adjacent frequencies — that is, if a station is licensed on 99.5 MHz in a city, the first-adjacent frequencies of 99.3 MHz and 99.7 MHz cannot be used anywhere within a certain distance of that station's transmitter, and the second-adjacent frequencies of 99.1 MHz and 99.9 MHz are restricted to specialized usages such as low-power stations. Similar restrictions formerly applied to third-adjacent frequencies as well (i.e. 98.9 MHz and 100.1 MHz in the example above), but these are no longer observed.

== See also ==
- Adjacent channel power ratio
- Federal Standard 1037C
- MIL-STD-188
