= ACPR =

ACPR may refer to:

- Adjacent channel power ratio
- French Prudential Supervision and Resolution Authority (French: Autorité de contrôle prudentiel et de résolution)
