= Slew-induced distortion =

Type of audio distortion

Slew-induced distortion (SID or slew-rate induced distortion) is caused when an amplifier or transducer is required to change output (or displacement), i.e. slew rate, faster than it is able to do so without error. At such times any other signals may suffer considerable gain distortion, leading to intermodulation distortion. Transient intermodulation distortion may involve some degree of SID and/or distortion due to peak compression.

These are effects that tend to occur only during parts of a waveform fed through audio amplifiers, that may give rise to audible degradation of the sound quality in music, even when fixed-frequency harmonic distortion tests show low amounts of distortion for a simple sinewave test signal.

TIM (Transient Intermodulation Distortion) was first discovered by Matti Otala in the 1960s due to accidentally wiring an amplifier incorrectly.
