= Intermodulation intercept point =

The intermodulation intercept point in electronics is a measure of an electrical device's linearity. When driven by two sinusoidal waveforms, it is the theoretical power level at which the power of the desired tone and the nth-order (where n is odd) intermodulation product intersect.

== See also ==
- Second-order intercept point (IP2/SOI)
- Third-order intercept point (IP3/TOI)
- Fifth-order intercept point (IP5)
