= Bias distortion =

In telecommunications, the term bias distortion has the following meanings:

1. Signal distortion resulting from a shift in the bias.
2. In digital signals, distortion of the signal in which all the significant intervals have uniformly longer or shorter durations than their theoretical durations.

Bias distortion is expressed in percent of the system-specified unit interval.
