= Gain compression =

Reduction in gain due to nonlinearity

Gain compression is a reduction in differential or slope gain caused by nonlinearity of the transfer function of an amplifying device for large-signal inputs.

== Overview ==
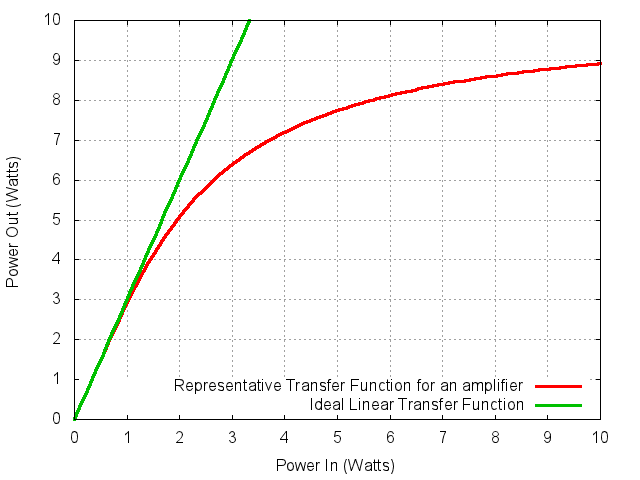
Power transfer curve for an ideal amplifier (green) with a linear gain of 3 and a real amplifier (red) whose gain gets more compressed as the input increases. At 2 Watts input, the ideal amplifier outputs 6 Watts while the real amplifier outputs ~5 Watts (a gain compression of 0.79 dB). Its OP1dB is just above 2 Watts.

When operating an amplifier beyond its linear range, gain compression will occur due to nonlinear circuit characteristics. The output of large-amplitude inputs will be less than expected when using the small signal gain of the amplifier, such that an increase in input will not be matched by a proportional increase in output. Gain compression is the difference between the ideal linear power transfer curve and the real circuit's power transfer curve.

An important gain compression parameter is the OP1dB, which is the power input that results in a 1 dB compression of the output power (OP), corresponding to a gain ratio of 10^{-1/10} = 79.4%.

Harmonic distortion results from nonlinear transfer curves. And once an amplifier's maximum amplitude is reached, signals will be clipped, resulting in even stronger harmonic distortion.

Nonlinearity may be caused by heat due to power dissipation. Also, a transistor's operating point may move with temperature.

== Relevance ==
Gain compression is relevant in any system with a wide dynamic range, such as audio or RF. It is more common in tube circuits than transistor circuits, due to topology differences, possibly causing the differences in audio performance called "valve sound". The front-end RF amps of radio receivers are particularly susceptible to this phenomenon when overloaded by a strong unwanted signal.

== Audio effects ==
A tube radio or tube amplifier will increase in volume to a point, and then as the input signal extends beyond the linear range of the device, the effective gain is reduced, altering the shape of the waveform. The effect is also present in transistor circuits. The extent of the effect depends on the topology of the amplifier.

== Radio-frequency compression ==
Gain compression in RF amplifiers is similar to soft clipping. However, in narrowband systems, the effect looks more like gain compression simply because the harmonics are filtered out after amplification. Many data sheets for RF amplifiers list gain compression rather than distortion figures because it's easier to measure and is more important than distortion figures in nonlinear RF amplifiers.

In wideband and low-frequency systems, the nonlinear effects are readily visible, e.g., the output is clipped. To see the same thing at 1 GHz, an oscilloscope with a bandwidth of at least 10 GHz is needed. Observing with a spectrum analyzer, the fundamental compressed and the harmonics picking up.

=== Examples of RF compression ===
A low-noise RF amplifier, if fed by a directional antenna to a consumer 900 MHz receiver, should improve the transmission range. It works, but the receiver may also pick up a couple of UHF stations around 700 MHz.

For example, if channel 54 is transmitting 6 MW of AM, FM, and PM, the RF front end, expecting −80 dBm, would be grossly overloaded and generate mixing products. This is a typical effect of gain compression.

== High-power loudspeakers ==
Power compression is a form of gain compression that takes place in loudspeaker voice coils when they heat up and increase their resistance. This causes less power to be drawn from the amplifier and a reduction in sound pressure level.

== Distinction with intentional dynamic range compression ==
Dynamic range compression is a more general term that typically refers to intentional compression, and may be done in the digital realm or analog realm. Automatic gain control circuits are intentionally designed to actively change the overall gain in response to the level of the input, resulting in a transfer function that may vary over time. Gain compression on the other hand is a consequence of analog amplifier circuit non-linearities that are generally undesired.

== See also ==
- Third-order intercept point
