= IP3 =

IP3 may refer to:

- Inositol trisphosphate (IP_{3}), used for signal transduction in biological cells
- Third-order intercept point, in radio telecommunication
- IP3 International, a nuclear technology company
