= Adjacent channel =

Frequency nearby another

In broadcasting, an adjacent channel is an AM, FM, or TV channel that is next to another channel. First-adjacent is immediately next to another channel, second-adjacent is two channels away, and so forth. Information on adjacent channels is used in keeping stations from interfering with one another.

== See also ==
- Co-channel
- Adjacent-channel interference
- Adjacent channel power ratio
