= IP5 =

IP5 may refer to:

- Internet Stream Protocol, a derivative of IPv5 and intended successor to IPv4, currently being replaced by IPv6
- Inositol pentakisphosphate, a molecule derived from inositol tetrakisphosphate
- Itinerários Principais (Principal Routes) 5, a road in Portugal
- "Intersection Point IP5", co-located with TOTEM at the Large Hadron Collider at CERN
- IP5 (intellectual property offices), the five largest intellectual property offices in the world
- Fifth-order intercept point, a measure of linearity in amplifiers and mixers
