= Ip Man (disambiguation) =

Ip Man (1893–1972) was a Chinese martial artist Wing Chun master.

Ip Man may also refer to:

- Ip Man (film series)
  - Ip Man (film), a 2008 Hong Kong film
  - Ip Man 2, a 2010 Hong Kong film
  - Ip Man 3, a 2015 Hong Kong film
  - Master Z: Ip Man Legacy, a 2018 Hong Kong film
  - Ip Man 4, a 2019 Hong Kong film
- The Legend Is Born: Ip Man, a 2010 Hong Kong film
- Ip Man: The Final Fight, a 2013 Hong Kong film
- Ip Man (TV series), a 2013 Chinese TV show
