= Measuring receiver =

Radio receiver used to measure radio signals

In telecommunication, a measuring receiver or measurement receiver is a calibrated laboratory-grade radio receiver designed to measure the characteristics of radio signals. The parameters of such receivers (tuning frequency, receiving bandwidth, gain) can be adjusted over a much more comprehensive range of values than other radio receivers. Their circuitry is optimized for stability and enables calibration and reproducible results. Some measurement receivers also have exceptionally robust input circuits that can survive brief impulses of more than 1000 V, as they can occur during measurements of radio signals on power lines and other conductors.

== Applications ==
Measuring receivers are used with calibrated antennas to:

- determine the signal strength and standard compliance of broadcast signals;
- investigate and quantify radio-frequency interference, and
- determine compliance of a device with electromagnetic interference and TEMPEST standards and regulations.

Measuring receivers are also used without antennas to calibrate RF attenuators and signal generators.

Measuring receivers are widely used in Metrology and calibration lab environments, spectrum monitoring and electromagnetic compatibility facilities.

== Types ==
Depending on the intended application area, several types of measuring receivers can be distinguished:

- Spectrum analyzers are intended to graphically display the amplitude spectrum of a radio signal on a logarithmic scale.
- Modulation analyzers are intended to accurately measure not only the signal power level, but also the degree of modulation (such as AM depth, FM/PM deviations), and modulation distortions.
- EMI receivers are designed to comply with the detailed equipment requirements of measurement standards for radio interference, such as the civilian specification CISPR 16-1-1 or the military specification MIL-STD 461. The EMI receiver has defined IF-Bandwidths (typically 200 Hz, 9 kHz, 120 kHz, 1 MHz) and standardized detector modes (peak, quasi peak, average, rms, CISPR-AV and CISPR-RMS, RMS-Average). They used a preselection for an improved dynamic range. Rohde & Schwarz holds the German Patent DE10126830B4 for RMS-Average Detector, which describes an implementation that allows to fulfill CISPR 16-1-1. Gauss Instruments builds EMI receivers that combine the novel technology of time-domain EMI measurement systems with traditional EMI Receivers.
- Time-domain EMI measurement systems and real-time EMI receivers perform a baseband sampling and simulate all the IF-Bandwidths and detectors digitally. Typically this is done via Short Time Fast Fourier Transform (STFFT). Such measurement systems emulate several thousand EMI receivers digitally in parallel. The most advanced instruments speed up the measurement by a factor of 4000. Measurements can be performed according to the standards CISPR 16-1-1, MIL-STD 461 and DO-160. The benefits are extremely fast full compliance measurements. The measurements are performed with defined IF Bandwidths according to CISPR or MIL-STD 461F as well as DO160 and the detector modes (peak, quasipeak, average, rms, CISPR-AV and CISPR-RMS, RMS-Average). They use a preselection for an improved dynamic range. Gauss Instruments provides full compliance EMI Receivers with a real-time analysis bandwidth of 645 MHz with 2 parallel CISPR Detectors. Real-time Scanning over several GHz is also available on selected products.
- TEMPEST receivers are designed to comply with the requirements of measurement standards for compromising emanations such as SDIP-27 or NSTISSAM TEMPEST/1-92. For example, their frequency range extends down to acoustic frequencies (typically 100 Hz), their bandwidth can be adjusted in 1-2-5 steps from a few hertz to more than 100 MHz, and their sensitivity and noise figure aims to be close to what is technically feasible.

Some measuring receivers (such as Agilent’s N5531S and MXE or Rohde & Schwarz's FSMR and ESU) also include a signal analyzer, power meter, and a sensor module to allow the instruments to be used together or individually for general-purpose measurement tasks.

The time-domain EMI measurement systems show additional features like weighted Spectrogram mode, oscilloscope mode as well and measurement of discontinuous disturbance according to CISPR 14-1.

== Requirements for Compliance Testing ==
Receivers used for compliance testing must fulfill the basic EMC standard CISPR 16-1-1. CISPR 16-1-1 defines requirements for the indication of CW Signals and pulses. The amplitude range where these requirements are met is called the CISPR indication range. Within this range, the receiver can be used for compliance tests. Usually, EMI receivers have a CISPR indication range that starts about 6 dB above the noise floor. A linearity usually demonstrates the performance check for sinusoidal signals and broadband pulses. This linearity check is performed over the amplitude range starting from typical levels of 10dBuV. Even if called fully compliant, some EMI receivers have a CISPR indication range that starts at higher levels, e.g., 40dBuV. Typically, only one level, e.g., 60dBuV, is presented for such receivers. A demonstration of CISPR compliance at lower levels cannot be demonstrated.

== See also ==
- Network analyzer (electrical)
