= Independence Party =

Independence Party may refer to:

== Active parties ==
=== Outside United States ===
- Independence Party (Egypt)
- Estonian Independence Party
- Independence Party (Finland)
- Independence Party (Iceland)
- Independence Party (Mauritius)
- Independence Party (Morocco)
- Puerto Rican Independence Party
- UK Independence Party

=== United States ===
- Alaskan Independence Party
- United Independent Party, Massachusetts
- Forward Independence Party
- Independence Party of New York

== Former parties ==
- Independence (Israeli political party)
- Independence Party (Lithuania)
- Independence Party (Mandatory Palestine)
- Independence Party (Mauritius)
- Irish Independence Party, Northern Ireland
- Korea Independence Party, South Korea
- Independence Party (United States)
- Independence Party of America, U.S.
- Independence Party (Victoria)
- Taiwan Independence Party
- Swatantra Party (Independence Party), India (1959–1974)
- Sikkim Swatantra Dal (Sikkim Independence Party), Sikkim, India (1958–1975)

== See also ==
- Partit per la Independència, Catalonia
