= Distortion =

Alteration of the original shape of a signal

In signal processing, distortion is the alteration of the original shape (or other characteristic) of a signal. In communications and electronics it means the alteration of the waveform of an information-bearing signal, such as an audio signal representing sound or a video signal representing images, in an electronic device or communication channel.

Distortion is usually unwanted, and so engineers strive to eliminate or minimize it. In some situations, however, distortion may be desirable. For example, in noise reduction systems like the Dolby system, an audio signal is deliberately distorted in ways that emphasize aspects of the signal that are subject to electrical noise, then it is symmetrically "undistorted" after passing through a noisy communication channel, reducing the noise in the received signal. Distortion is also used as a musical effect, particularly with electric guitars.

The addition of noise or other outside signals (hum, interference) is not considered distortion, though the effects of quantization distortion are sometimes included in noise. Quality measures that reflect both noise and distortion include the signal-to-noise and distortion (SINAD) ratio and total harmonic distortion plus noise (THD+N).

== Electronic signals ==
In telecommunications and signal processing, a noise-free system can be characterised by a transfer function, such that the output $y(t)$ can be written as a function of the input $x$ as

$$y(t) = F(x(t))$$

When the transfer function comprises only a perfect gain constant A and perfect delay T

$$y(t) = A\cdot x(t-T)$$

the output is undistorted. Distortion occurs when the transfer function F is more complicated than this. If F is a linear function, for instance a filter whose gain and/or delay varies with frequency, the signal suffers linear distortion. Linear distortion does not introduce new frequency components to a signal but does alter the balance of existing ones.

Graph of a waveform and some distorted versions of the same waveform

This diagram shows the behaviour of a signal (made up of a square wave followed by a sine wave) as it is passed through various distorting functions.

1. The first trace (in black) shows the input. It also shows the output from a non-distorting transfer function (straight line).
2. A high-pass filter (green trace) distorts the shape of a square wave by reducing its low frequency components. This is the cause of the "droop" seen on the top of the pulses. This "pulse distortion" can be very significant when a train of pulses must pass through an AC-coupled (high-pass filtered) amplifier. As the sine wave contains only one frequency, its shape is unaltered.
3. A low-pass filter (blue trace) rounds the pulses by removing the high frequency components. All systems are low pass to some extent. Note that the phase of the sine wave is different for the lowpass and the highpass cases, due to the phase distortion of the filters.
4. A slightly non-linear transfer function (purple), this one gently compresses the peaks of the sine wave, as may be typical of a tube audio amplifier. This generates small amounts of low order harmonics.
5. A hard-clipping transfer function (red) generates high order harmonics. Parts of the transfer function are flat, which indicates that all information about the input signal has been lost in this region.

The transfer function of an ideal amplifier, with perfect gain and delay, is only an approximation. The true behavior of the system is usually different. Nonlinearities in the transfer function of an active device (such as vacuum tubes, transistors, and operational amplifiers) are a common source of non-linear distortion; in passive components (such as a coaxial cable or optical fiber), linear distortion can be caused by inhomogeneities, reflections, and so on in the propagation path.

=== Amplitude distortion ===
Amplitude distortion is distortion occurring in a system, subsystem, or device when the output amplitude is not a linear function of the input amplitude under specified conditions.

=== Harmonic distortion ===
Harmonic distortion adds overtones that are whole number multiples of a sound wave's frequencies. Nonlinearities that give rise to amplitude distortion in audio systems are most often measured in terms of the harmonics (overtones) added to a pure sinewave fed to the system. Harmonic distortion may be expressed in terms of the relative strength of individual components, in decibels, or the root mean square of all harmonic components: Total harmonic distortion (THD), as a percentage. The level at which harmonic distortion becomes audible depends on the exact nature of the distortion. Different types of distortion (like crossover distortion) are more audible than others (like soft clipping) even if the THD measurements are identical. Harmonic distortion in radio frequency applications is rarely expressed as THD.

=== Frequency response distortion ===
Non-flat frequency response is a form of distortion that occurs when different frequencies are amplified by different amounts in a filter. For example, the non-uniform frequency response curve of AC-coupled cascade amplifier is an example of frequency distortion. In the audio case, this is mainly caused by room acoustics, poor loudspeakers and microphones, long loudspeaker cables in combination with frequency dependent loudspeaker impedance, etc.

=== Phase distortion ===
This form of distortion mostly occurs due to electrical reactance. Here, all the components of the input signal are not amplified with the same phase shift, hence making some parts of the output signal out of phase with the rest of the output.

=== Group delay distortion ===
Can be found only in dispersive media. In a waveguide, phase velocity varies with frequency. In a filter, group delay tends to peak near the cut-off frequency, resulting in pulse distortion. When analog long distance trunks were commonplace, for example in 12 channel carrier, group delay distortion had to be corrected in repeaters.

== Correction of distortion ==
As the system output is given by y(t) = F(x(t)), then if the inverse function F^{−1} can be found, and used intentionally to distort either the input or the output of the system, then the distortion is corrected.

An example of a similar correction is where LP/vinyl recordings or FM audio transmissions are deliberately pre-emphasised by a linear filter, the reproducing system applies an inverse filter to make the overall system undistorted.

Correction is not possible if the inverse does not exist—for instance if the transfer function has flat spots (the inverse would map multiple input points to a single output point). This produces an uncorrectable loss of information. Such a situation can occur when an amplifier is overdriven—causing clipping or slew rate distortion when, for a moment, the amplifier characteristics alone and not the input signal determine the output.

=== Cancellation of even-order harmonic distortion ===
Many symmetrical electronic circuits reduce the magnitude of even harmonics generated by the non-linearities of the amplifier's components, by combining two signals from opposite halves of the circuit where distortion components that are roughly the same magnitude but out of phase. Examples include push-pull amplifiers and long-tailed pairs.

== Teletypewriter or modem signaling ==
In binary signaling such as FSK, distortion is the shifting of the significant instants of the signal pulses from their proper positions relative to the beginning of the start pulse. The magnitude of the distortion is expressed in percent of an ideal unit pulse length. This is sometimes called bias distortion.

Telegraphic distortion is a similar and older problem, distorting the ratio between mark and space intervals.

== Audio distortion ==
A graph of a waveform and the distorted version of the same waveform

Distorted waveforms
An audio example of a short sample followed by different distorted versions of it.

With respect to audio, distortion refers to any kind of deformation of an output waveform compared to its input, usually clipping, harmonic distortion, or intermodulation distortion (mixing phenomena) caused by non-linear behavior of electronic components and power supply limitations. Terms for specific types of nonlinear audio distortion include: crossover distortion and slew-induced distortion (SID).

Other forms of audio distortion are non-flat frequency response, compression, modulation, aliasing, quantization noise, wow and flutter from analog media such as vinyl records and magnetic tape. The human ear cannot hear phase distortion, except that it may affect the stereo imaging.

In most fields, distortion is characterized as unwanted change to a signal. Distortion in music is often intentionally used as an effect when applied to an electric guitar signal in styles of rock music such as heavy metal and punk rock.

== Distortion in art ==
In the visual arts a distortion is any change made by an artist to the size, shape or visual character of a form in order to express an idea, convey a feeling, or enhance visual impact. Such distortions or "abstractions" primarily refer to purposeful deviations from photorealistic perspective or from realistic proportionality. Examples include "The Weeping Woman" by Picasso and "The Adoration of the Shepherds" by El Greco, whose human subject matters are irregularly and (as is often with physical distortions) asymmetrically proportioned in a way that is not possible in standard perspective.

== Optics ==
In optics, image/optical distortion is a divergence from rectilinear projection caused by a change in magnification with increasing distance from the optical axis of an optical system.

== Map projections ==
In cartography, a distortion is the misrepresentation of the area or shape of a feature. The Mercator projection, for example, distorts by exaggerating the size of regions at high latitude.

== See also ==
- Aliasing
- Attenuation distortion
- Audio system measurements
- Bias distortion
- Distortion synthesis
- Fading
- Image warping
- Lossy compression
