= Millman's theorem =

Electrical engineering theorem

In electrical engineering, Millman's theorem (or the parallel generator theorem) is a method to simplify the solution of a circuit. Specifically, Millman's theorem is used to compute the voltage at the ends of a circuit made up of only branches in parallel.

It is named after Jacob Millman, who proved the theorem.

== Explanation ==
Application of Millman's theorem

Let $e_k$ be the generators' voltages. Let $R_k$ be the resistances on the branches with voltage generators $e_k$. Then Millman states that the voltage at the ends of the circuit is given by:

$$v=\frac{\sum{\frac{e_k}{R_k}}} {\sum{\frac{1}{R_k}}}.$$

That is, the sum of the short circuit currents in branch divided by the sum of the conductances in each branch.

It can be proved by considering the circuit as a single supernode. Then, according to Ohm and Kirchhoff, the voltage between the ends of the circuit is equal to the total current entering the supernode divided by the total equivalent conductance of the supernode. The total current is the sum of the currents in each branch. The total equivalent conductance of the supernode is the sum of the conductance of each branch, since all the branches are in parallel.

== Branch variations ==
=== Current sources ===
One method of deriving Millman's theorem starts by converting all the branches to current sources (which can be done using Norton's theorem). A branch that is already a current source is simply not converted. In the expression above, this is equivalent to replacing the $e_k/R_k$ term in the numerator of the expression above with the current of the current generator, where the kth branch is the branch with the current generator. The parallel conductance of the current source is added to the denominator as for the series conductance of the voltage sources. An ideal current source has zero conductance (infinite resistance) and so adds nothing to the denominator.

=== Ideal voltage sources ===
If one of the branches is an ideal voltage source, Millman's theorem cannot be used, but in this case the solution is trivial, the voltage at the output is forced to the voltage of the ideal voltage source. The theorem does not work with ideal voltage sources because such sources have zero resistance (infinite conductance) so the summation of both the numerator and denominator are infinite and the result is indeterminate.

== See also ==
- Analysis of resistive circuits
