= Dependent source =

Voltage or current source dependent on another in the network

A simple electric circuit made up of a voltage source and a resistor. Here, $V=iR$, according to Ohm's law.

In the theory of electrical networks, a dependent source is a voltage source or a current source whose value depends on a voltage or current elsewhere in the network.

Dependent sources are useful, for example, in modeling the behavior of amplifiers. A bipolar junction transistor can be modeled as a dependent current source whose magnitude depends on the magnitude of the current fed into its controlling base terminal. An operational amplifier can be described as a voltage source dependent on the differential input voltage between its input terminals. Practical circuit elements have properties such as finite power capacity, voltage, current, or frequency limits that mean an ideal source is only an approximate model. Accurate modeling of practical devices requires using several idealized elements in combination.

== Classification ==
Voltage-controlled voltage source

Voltage-controlled current source

Current-controlled current source

Current-controlled voltage source

Dependent sources can be classified as follows:

- Voltage-controlled voltage source: The source delivers the voltage as per the voltage of the dependent element. $V={f_a}({v_x})$
- Voltage-controlled current source: The source delivers the current as per the voltage of the dependent element. $I={f_b}({v_x})$
- Current-controlled current source: The source delivers the current as per the current of the dependent element. $I={f_c}({i_x})$
- Current-controlled voltage source: The source delivers the voltage as per the current of the dependent element. $V={f_d}({i_x})$

Dependent sources are not necessarily linear. For example, MOSFET switches can be modeled as a voltage-controlled current source when $V_{\rm DS}>V_{\rm GS}-V_T$ and $V_{\rm GS}>V_T$.

However, the relationship between the current flowing through it and $V_{\rm DS}$ is approximately:

$I_{\rm D} = \frac{\mu_n C_{\rm ox}}{2}\frac{W}{L}(V_{\rm GS}-V_{\rm th})^2 \left(1+\lambda (V_{\rm DS}-V_{\rm DSsat})\right).$

In this case, the current is not linear to $V_{\rm DS}$, but rather approximately proportional to the square of $V_{\rm DS}-V_T$.

As for the case of linear dependent sources, the proportionality constant between dependent and independent variables is dimensionless if they are both currents (or both voltages). A voltage controlled by a current has a proportionality factor expressed in units of resistance (ohms), and this constant is sometimes called "transresistance". A current controlled by a voltage has units of conductance (siemens), and is called "transconductance". Transconductance is a commonly used specification for measuring the performance of field effect transistors and vacuum tubes.

== See also ==
- Circuit theory
- Ground (electricity)
- Mathematical methods in electronics
- Open-circuit voltage
- Lumped-element model
- Distributed-element model
- Series and parallel circuits
- Superposition theorem
- SPICE
- Topology (electronics)
- Trancitor
- Mesh analysis
