= Mathematical methods in electronics =

Mathematical methods are integral to the study of electronics.

== Mathematics in electronics engineering ==
Mathematical methods in electronics engineering involves applying mathematical principles to analyze, design, and optimize electronic circuits and systems. Key areas include:

- Linear algebra: Used to solve systems of linear equations that arise in circuit analysis. Applications include network theory and the analysis of electrical circuits using matrices and vector spaces
- Calculus: Essential for understanding changes in electronic signals. Used in the analysis of dynamic systems and control systems. Integral calculus is used in analyzing waveforms and signals.
- Differential equations: Applied to model and analyze the behavior of circuits over time. Used in the study of filters, oscillators, and transient responses of circuits.
- Complex numbers and complex analysis: Important for circuit analysis and impedance calculations. Used in signal processing and to solve problems involving sinusoidal signals.
- Probability and statistics: Used in signal processing and communication systems to handle noise and random signals. Reliability analysis of electronic components.
- Fourier and Laplace transforms: Crucial for analyzing signals and systems. Fourier transforms are used for frequency analysis and signal processing. Laplace transforms are used for solving differential equations and analyzing system stability.
- Numerical methods: Employed for simulating and solving complex circuits that cannot be solved analytically. Used in computer-aided design tools for electronic circuit design.
- Vector calculus: Applied in electromagnetic field theory. Important for understanding the behavior of electromagnetic waves and fields in electronic devices.
- Optimization: Techniques used to design efficient circuits and systems. Applications include minimizing power consumption and maximizing signal integrity.

These methods are integral to systematically analyzing and improving the performance and functionality of electronic devices and systems.

== Mathematical methods applied in foundational electrical laws and theorems ==
A number of fundamental electrical laws and theorems apply to all electrical networks. These include:

- Faraday's law of induction: Any change in the magnetic environment of a coil of wire will cause a voltage (emf) to be "induced" in the coil.
- Gauss's law: The total of the electric flux out of a closed surface is equal to the charge enclosed divided by the permittivity.
- Kirchhoff's current law: The sum of all currents entering a node is equal to the sum of all currents leaving the node, or the sum of total current at a junction is zero.
- Kirchhoff's voltage law: The directed sum of the electrical potential differences around a circuit must be zero.
- Ohm's law: The voltage across a resistor is the product of its resistance and the current flowing through it, at constant temperature.
- Norton's theorem: Any two-terminal collection of voltage sources and resistors is electrically equivalent to an ideal current source in parallel with a single resistor.
- Thévenin's theorem: Any two-terminal combination of voltage sources and resistors is electrically equivalent to a single voltage source in series with a single resistor.
- Millman's theorem: The voltage on the ends of branches in parallel is equal to the sum of the currents flowing in every branch divided by the total equivalent conductance.

== Analytical methods ==
In addition to the foundational principles and theorems, several analytical methods are integral to the study of electronics:

- Network analysis (electrical circuits): Essential for comprehending capacitor and inductor behavior under changing voltage inputs, particularly significant in fields such as signal processing, power electronics, and control systems. This entails solving intricate networks of resistors through techniques like node-voltage and mesh-current methods.
- Signal analysis: Involves Fourier analysis, Nyquist–Shannon sampling theorem, and information theory, essential for understanding and manipulating signals in various systems.

These methods build on the foundational laws and theorems provide insights and tools for the analysis and design of complex electronic systems.

== See also ==
- Introduction to Electronics Georgia Tech
- University of California, Santa Cruz Electrical Engineering curriculum
- University of California, Berkeley Electrical Engineering curriculum (UCSC Catalog) (Berkeley Academic Guide)
