= Supernode =

Supernode may refer to:

- Supernode (networking), a network proxy in peer-to-peer networks
- Supernode (circuit), a theoretical construct in circuit theory
- A construct in nodal analysis, a circuit analysis technique used in electrical engineering
