= Engineering mathematics =

Branch of applied mathematics

Engineering Mathematics is a branch of applied mathematics, concerning mathematical methods and techniques that are typically used in engineering and industry. Along with fields like engineering physics and engineering geology, both of which may belong in the wider category engineering science, engineering mathematics is an interdisciplinary subject motivated by engineers' needs both for practical, theoretical and other considerations outside their specialization, and to deal with constraints to be effective in their work.

== Description ==
Historically, engineering mathematics consisted mostly of applied analysis, most notably: differential equations; real and complex analysis (including vector and tensor analysis); approximation theory (broadly construed, to include asymptotic, variational, and perturbative methods, representations, numerical analysis); Fourier analysis; potential theory; as well as linear algebra and applied probability, outside of analysis. These areas of mathematics were intimately tied to the development of Newtonian physics, and the mathematical physics of that period. This history also left a legacy: until the early 20th century subjects such as classical mechanics were often taught in applied mathematics departments at American universities, and fluid mechanics may still be taught in (applied) mathematics as well as engineering departments.

The success of modern numerical computer methods and software has led to the emergence of computational mathematics, computational science, and computational engineering (the last two are sometimes lumped together and abbreviated as CS&E), which occasionally use high-performance computing for the simulation of phenomena and the solution of problems in the sciences and engineering. These are often considered interdisciplinary fields, but are also of interest to engineering mathematics.

Specialized branches include engineering optimization and engineering statistics.

Engineering mathematics in tertiary education typically consists of mathematical methods and models courses.

== See also ==
- Industrial mathematics
- Control theory, a mathematical discipline concerned with engineering
- Further mathematics and additional mathematics, A-level mathematics courses with similar content
- Mathematical methods in electronics, signal processing and radio engineering
