= Supernode (circuit) =

Theoretical construct in circuit theory

In this circuit, both V_{A} and V_{B} are supernodes. V_{A} has two unreferenced nodes, whereas V_{B} has one referenced node (ground) and one unreferenced node.

In circuit theory, a supernode is a theoretical construct that can be used to solve a circuit. This is done by viewing a voltage source on a wire as a point source voltage in relation to other point voltages located at various nodes in the circuit, relative to a ground node assigned a zero or negative charge. A supernode exists when an ideal voltage source appears between any two nodes of an electric circuit.

Each supernode contains two nodes, one non-reference node and another node that may be a second non-reference node or the reference node. Supernodes containing the reference node have one node voltage variable. For nodal analysis, the supernode construct is only required between two non-reference nodes.

== Nodal analysis ==
It is related to Kirchhoff's current law which states that the total or algebraic sum of currents meeting at a junction or node is zero. Every junction where two or more branches meet is a node. One of the nodes in the network is taken as reference node. If there are n nodes in any network, the number of simultaneous equation to be solved will be (n-1).

== See also ==
- Node
