= Electrical element =

Idealized versions of real electronic components used in circuit analysis

In electrical engineering, electrical elements are conceptual abstractions representing idealized electrical components, such as resistors, capacitors, and inductors, used in the analysis of electrical networks. All electrical networks can be analyzed as multiple electrical elements interconnected by wires. Where the elements roughly correspond to real components, the representation can be in the form of a schematic diagram or circuit diagram. This is called a lumped-element circuit model. In other cases, infinitesimal elements are used to model the network in a distributed-element model.

These ideal electrical elements represent actual, physical electrical or electronic components. Still, they do not exist physically and are assumed to have ideal properties. In contrast, actual electrical components have less than ideal properties, a degree of uncertainty in their values, and some degree of nonlinearity. To model the nonideal behavior of a real circuit component may require a combination of multiple ideal electrical elements to approximate its function. For example, an inductor circuit element is assumed to have inductance but no resistance or capacitance, while a real inductor, a coil of wire, has some resistance in addition to its inductance. This may be modeled by an ideal inductance element in series with a resistance.

Circuit analysis using electric elements is useful for understanding practical networks of electrical components. Analyzing how a network is affected by its individual elements makes it possible to estimate how a real network will behave.

== Types ==
Circuit elements can be classified into different categories. One is how many terminals they have to connect them to other components:

- One-port elements – represent the simplest components, with only two terminals to connect to. Examples are
  - resistances,
  - capacitances,
  - inductances,
  - and diodes.
- Two-port elements – are the most common multiport elements with four terminals consisting of two ports.
- Multiport elements – these have more than two terminals. They connect to the external circuit through multiple pairs of terminals called ports. For example,
  - a transformer with three separate windings has six terminals and could be idealized as a three-port element; the ends of each winding are connected to a pair of terminals representing a port.

Elements can also be divided into active and passive:

- Passive elements – These elements do not have a source of energy; examples are
  - diodes,
  - resistances,
  - capacitances,
  - and inductances.
- Active elements or sources – these are elements which can source electrical power. They can be used to represent ideal batteries and power supplies; examples are
  - voltage sources
  - and current sources.
    - Dependent sources – These are two-port elements with a voltage or current source proportional to the voltage or current at a second pair of terminals. These are used in the modelling of amplifying components such as
      - transistors,
      - vacuum tubes,
      - and op-amps.

Another distinction is between linear and nonlinear:

- Linear elements – these are elements in which the constituent relation, the relation between voltage and current, is a linear function. They obey the superposition principle. Examples of linear elements are resistances, capacitances, inductances, and linear-dependent sources. Circuits with only linear elements, linear circuits, do not cause intermodulation distortion and can be easily analysed with powerful mathematical techniques such as the Laplace transform.

This graph shows the nonlinearity of the current versus voltage curve of diodes.

- Nonlinear elements – these are elements in which the relation between voltage and current is a nonlinear function. An example is a diode, where the current is an exponential function of the voltage. Circuits with nonlinear elements are harder to analyse and design, often requiring circuit simulation computer programs such as SPICE.

== One-port elements ==
Only nine types of element (memristor not included), five passive and four active, are required to model any electrical component or circuit. Each element is defined by a relation between the state variables of the network: current, $I$; voltage, $V$; charge, $Q$; and magnetic flux, $\Phi$.

- Two sources:
  - Current source, measured in amperes – produces a current in a conductor. Affects charge according to the relation $dQ = -I\,dt$.
  - Voltage source, measured in volts – produces a potential difference between two points. Affects magnetic flux according to the relation $d\Phi = V\,dt$.

$\Phi$ in this relationship does not necessarily represent anything physically meaningful. In the case of the current generator, $Q$, the time integral of current represents the quantity of electric charge physically delivered by the generator. Here $\Phi$ is the time integral of voltage, but whether or not that represents a physical quantity depends on the nature of the voltage source. For a voltage generated by magnetic induction, it is meaningful, but for an electrochemical source, or a voltage that is the output of another circuit, no physical meaning is attached to it.
Both these elements are necessarily non-linear elements. See #Non-linear elements below.

- Three passive elements:
  - Resistance $R$, measured in ohms – produces a voltage proportional to the current flowing through the element. Relates voltage and current according to the relation $dV = R\,dI$.
  - Capacitance $C$, measured in farads – produces a current proportional to the rate of change of voltage across the element. Relates charge and voltage according to the relation $dQ = C\,dV$.
  - Inductance $L$, measured in henries – produces the magnetic flux proportional to the rate of change of current through the element. Relates flux and current according to the relation $d\Phi = L\,dI$.
- Four abstract active elements:
  - Voltage-controlled voltage source (VCVS) Generates a voltage based on another voltage with respect to a specified gain. (has infinite input impedance and zero output impedance).
  - Voltage-controlled current source (VCCS) Generates a current based on a voltage elsewhere in the circuit, with respect to a specified gain, used to model field-effect transistors and vacuum tubes (has infinite input impedance and infinite output impedance). The gain is characterised by a transfer conductance which will have units of siemens.
  - Current-controlled voltage source (CCVS) Generates a voltage based on an input current elsewhere in the circuit with respect to a specified gain. (has zero input impedance and zero output impedance). Used to model trancitors. The gain is characterised by a transfer impedance which will have units of ohms.
  - Current-controlled current source (CCCS) Generates a current based on an input current and a specified gain. Used to model bipolar junction transistors. (Has zero input impedance and infinite output impedance).

These four elements are examples of two-port elements.

=== Non-linear elements ===
Conceptual symmetries of resistor, capacitor, inductor, and memristor.

In reality, all circuit components are non-linear and can only be approximated as linear over a certain range. To describe the passive elements more precisely, their constitutive relation is used instead of simple proportionality. Six constitutive relations can be formed from any two of the circuit variables. From this, there is supposed to be a theoretical fourth passive element since there are only five elements in total (not including the various dependent sources) found in linear network analysis. This additional element is called memristor. It only has any meaning as a time-dependent non-linear element; as a time-independent linear element, it reduces to a regular resistor. Hence, it is not included in linear time-invariant (LTI) circuit models. The constitutive relations of the passive elements are given by;

- Resistance: constitutive relation defined as $f(V, I)=0$.
- Capacitance: constitutive relation defined as $f(V, Q)=0$.
- Inductance: constitutive relation defined as $f(\Phi, I)=0$.
- Memristance: constitutive relation defined as $f(\Phi, Q)=0$.

where $f(x,y)$ is an arbitrary function of two variables.

In some special cases, the constitutive relation simplifies to a function of one variable. This is the case for all linear elements, but also, for example, an ideal diode, which in circuit theory terms is a non-linear resistor, has a constitutive relation of the form $V = f(I)$. Both independent voltage and independent current sources can be considered non-linear resistors under this definition.

The fourth passive element, the memristor, was proposed by Leon Chua in a 1971 paper, but a physical component demonstrating memristance was not created until thirty-seven years later. It was reported on April 30, 2008, that a working memristor had been developed by a team at HP Labs led by scientist R. Stanley Williams. With the advent of the memristor, each pairing of the four variables can now be related.

Two special non-linear elements are sometimes used in analysis but are not the ideal counterpart of any real component:

- Nullator: defined as $V = I = 0$
- Norator: defined as an element that places no restrictions on voltage and current whatsoever.

These are sometimes used in models of components with more than two terminals: transistors, for instance.

== Two-port elements ==
All the above are two-terminal, or one-port, elements except the dependent sources. Two lossless, passive, linear two-port elements are typically introduced into network analysis. Their constitutive relations in matrix notation are;

Transformer

$$\begin{bmatrix}  V_1  \\ I_2  \end{bmatrix} = \begin{bmatrix} 0 & n \\ -n & 0 \end{bmatrix}\begin{bmatrix} I_1  \\ V_2 \end{bmatrix}$$

Gyrator

$$\begin{bmatrix}  V_1  \\ V_2  \end{bmatrix} = \begin{bmatrix} 0 & -r \\ r & 0 \end{bmatrix}\begin{bmatrix} I_1  \\ I_2 \end{bmatrix}$$

The transformer maps a voltage at one port to a voltage at the other in a ratio of n. The current between the same two ports is mapped by 1/n. On the other hand, the gyrator maps a voltage at one port to a current at the other. Likewise, currents are mapped to voltages. The quantity r in the matrix is in units of resistance. The gyrator is a necessary element in analysis because it is not reciprocal. Networks built from just the basic linear elements are necessarily reciprocal, so they cannot be used by themselves to represent a non-reciprocal system. It is not essential, however, to have both the transformer and gyrator. Two gyrators in cascade are equivalent to a transformer, but the transformer is usually retained for convenience. The introduction of the gyrator also makes either capacitance or inductance non-essential since a gyrator terminated with one of these at port 2 will be equivalent to the other at port 1. However, transformer, capacitance, and inductance are normally retained in analysis because they are the ideal properties of the basic physical components transformer, inductor, and capacitor, whereas a practical gyrator must be constructed as an active circuit.

== Examples ==
The following are examples of representations of components by way of electrical elements.

- On a first degree of approximation, a battery is represented by a voltage source. A more refined model also includes a resistance in series with the voltage source to represent the battery's internal resistance (which results in the battery heating and the voltage dropping when in use). A current source in parallel may be added to represent its leakage (which discharges the battery over a long period).
- On a first degree of approximation, a resistor is represented by a resistance. A more refined model also includes a series inductance to represent the effects of its lead inductance (resistors constructed as a spiral have more significant inductance). A capacitance in parallel may be added to represent the capacitive effect of the proximity of the resistor leads to each other. A wire can be represented as a low-value resistor.
- Current sources are often used when representing semiconductors. For example, on a first degree of approximation, a bipolar transistor may be represented by a variable current source controlled by the input current.

== See also ==
- Transmission line
