= Jacob Millman =

Ukrainian academic (1911–1991)

Jacob Millman (1911 in Novohrad-Volynskyi, Russian Empire – May 22, 1991 in Longboat Key, Florida) was a professor of electrical engineering at Columbia University. He immigrated to the United States in 1913 with his mother, Gertrude (Nachshen) Millman and sister Rebecca.

Millman received a PhD from MIT in 1935. He joined Columbia University in 1951, and retired in 1975. From 1941 to 1987, Millman wrote eight textbooks on electronics, and he helped develop radar systems. Millman's theorem (otherwise known as the parallel generator theorem) is named after him. He received in 1970 the IEEE Education Medal.

Millman died of pneumonia at his home in Longboat Key, Florida in 1991.
