= Node (circuits) =

Region of an electrical circuit between two components

Each color in the circuit represents one node.

In electrical engineering, a node is any region or joining point on a circuit between two circuit elements. In circuit diagrams, connections are ideal wires with zero resistance. Whether "node" refers to a single point of junction or an entire equipotential region varies by the source.

"Node" is often used, especially in mesh analysis, to mean a principal node, which is distinct from the usage defined above. A principal node is a point in a circuit diagram where three or more connections meet. Principal nodes are important points of consideration in applying Kirchhoff's circuit laws, because conservation of current means current can split or combine at these points.

When clarification is needed, a region connecting only two circuit elements is referred to as a simple node, where there is no branching of current, while a point connecting three or more elements is a principal node. The full definition uses in this article encompasses both principal and simple nodes.

== Details ==
According to Ohm's law, V = IR, the voltage V across any two points of a node with negligible resistance R is

$$V = IR = I\cdot 0 = 0,$$

showing that the electric potential at every point of a node is the same.

There are some notable exceptions where the voltage difference is large enough to become significant:

- High-precision resistance measurements using a Kelvin connection
- The difference in voltage between ground and neutral, between the neutral wire and the ground in domestic AC power plugs and sockets, can be fatal. A properly installed electrical system connects them together at only one location, leading many people to the fatally incorrect conclusion that they are at "the same" voltage, or that the safety ground is "redundant and unnecessary"
- The Seebeck effect and the Peltier effect
- Joints involving aluminium wire

Dots used to mark nodes on a circuit diagram are sometimes referred to as meatballs.
