= SapWin =

Electrical circuit simulator

Symbolic Analysis Program for Windows (SAPWIN)
- Developer: University of Florence
- Stable release: 4.0 beta / November 2019; 6 years ago
- Written in: C++
- Operating system: Windows
- Available in: English
- Type: Electronic design automation
- License: SapWin: proprietary SapecNG: GNU GPL
- Website: www.sapwin.info

Symbolic Analysis Program for Windows (SAPWIN) is a proprietary symbolic circuit simulator written in C++ for the Microsoft Windows operating systems Vista, 7.0 and 8.1. Unlike more common numerical circuit simulators (such as Simulation Program with Integrated Circuit Emphasis (SPICE)), SAPWIN can generate analytical Laplace domain expressions for arbitrary network functions of linear analog circuits. The SAPWIN package also includes tools for schematic capture and graphic post-processing.

SAPWIN is available free from its homepage at the University of Florence website.

== SapecNG ==
Symbolic Analysis Program for Electric Circuits - Next Generation (SapecNG) is the open-source software relative of SAPWIN, written in Boost C++ libraries and designed to be cross-platform. QSapecNG is a Qt-based graphical user interface (GUI) and schematic capture program for SAPEC-NG.

== See also ==
- Comparison of EDA software
- List of free electronics circuit simulators
- Symbolic Circuit Analysis
