= Network analysis (electrical circuits) =

Determining all voltages and currents within an electrical network

Linear network analysis
Elements
Resistance Reactance Impedance Conductance
Components
Series and parallel circuits
Impedance transforms
Y-Δ transform Δ-Y transform star-polygon transforms
Generator theorems	Network theorems
Network analysis methods
Two-port parameters
z-parameters y-parameters h-parameters g-parameters S-parameters

In electrical engineering and electronics, a network is a collection of interconnected components. Network analysis is the process of finding the voltages across, and the currents through, all network components. There are many techniques for calculating these values; however, for the most part, the techniques assume linear components. Except where stated, the methods described in this article are applicable only to linear network analysis.

== Definitions ==
Component	A device with two or more terminals into which, or out of which, current may flow.
Node	A point at which terminals of more than two components are joined. A conductor with a substantially zero resistance is considered to be a node for the purpose of analysis.
Branch	The component(s) joining two nodes.
Mesh	A group of branches within a network joined so as to form a complete loop such that there is no other loop inside it.
Port	Two terminals where the current into one is identical to the current out of the other.
Circuit	A current from one terminal of a generator, through load component(s) and back into the other terminal. A circuit is, in this sense, a one-port network and is a trivial case to analyse. If there is any connection to any other circuits then a non-trivial network has been formed and at least two ports must exist. Often, "circuit" and "network" are used interchangeably, but many analysts reserve "network" to mean an idealised model consisting of ideal components.
Transfer function	The relationship of the currents and/or voltages between two ports. Most often, an input port and an output port are discussed and the transfer function is described as gain or attenuation.
Component transfer function	For a two-terminal component (i.e. one-port component), the current and voltage are taken as the input and output and the transfer function will have units of impedance or admittance (it is usually a matter of arbitrary convenience whether voltage or current is considered the input). A three (or more) terminal component effectively has two (or more) ports and the transfer function cannot be expressed as a single impedance. The usual approach is to express the transfer function as a matrix of parameters. These parameters can be impedances, but there is a large number of other approaches (see two-port network).

== Equivalent circuits ==
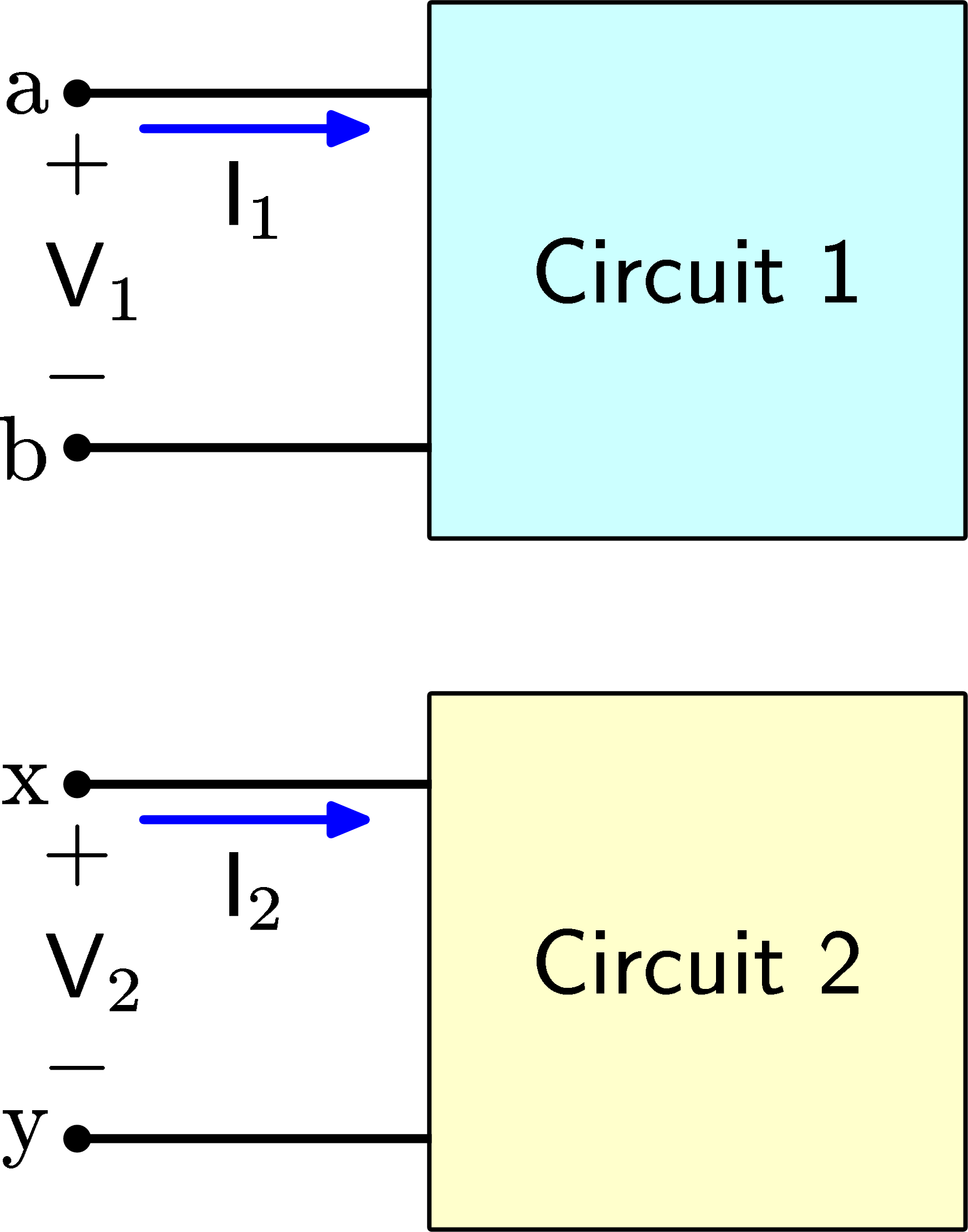

A useful procedure in network analysis is to simplify the network by reducing the number of components. This can be done by replacing physical components with other notional components that have the same effect. A particular technique might directly reduce the number of components, for instance by combining impedances in series. On the other hand, it might merely change the form into one in which the components can be reduced in a later operation. For instance, one might transform a voltage generator into a current generator using Norton's theorem in order to be able to later combine the internal resistance of the generator with a parallel impedance load.

A resistive circuit is a circuit containing only resistors, ideal current sources, and ideal voltage sources. If the sources are constant (DC) sources, the result is a DC circuit. Analysis of a circuit consists of solving for the voltages and currents present in the circuit. The solution principles outlined here also apply to phasor analysis of AC circuits.

Two circuits are said to be equivalent with respect to a pair of terminals if the voltage across the terminals and current through the terminals for one network have the same relationship as the voltage and current at the terminals of the other network.

If $V_2=V_1$ implies $I_2=I_1$ for all (real) values of V_{1}, then with respect to terminals ab and xy, circuit 1 and circuit 2 are equivalent.

The above is a sufficient definition for a one-port network. For more than one port, then it must be defined that the currents and voltages between all pairs of corresponding ports must bear the same relationship. For instance, star and delta networks are effectively three port networks and hence require three simultaneous equations to fully specify their equivalence.

=== Impedances in series and in parallel ===
Some two terminal network of impedances can eventually be reduced to a single impedance by successive applications of impedances in series or impedances in parallel.

- Impedances in series:
  $$Z_\mathrm{eq} = Z_1 + Z_2 + \,\cdots\, + Z_n .$$
- Impedances in parallel:
  $$\frac{1}{Z_\mathrm{eq}} = \frac{1}{Z_1}  +   \frac{1}{Z_2}  + \,\cdots\, +  \frac{1}{Z_n} .$$
  - The above simplified for only two impedances in parallel:
    $$Z_\mathrm{eq} = \frac{Z_1Z_2}{Z_1 + Z_2} .$$

=== Delta-wye transformation ===

A network of impedances with more than two terminals cannot be reduced to a single impedance equivalent circuit. An n-terminal network can, at best, be reduced to n impedances (at worst $\tbinom{n}{2}$). For a three terminal network, the three impedances can be expressed as a three node delta (Δ) network or four node star (Y) network. These two networks are equivalent and the transformations between them are given below. A general network with an arbitrary number of nodes cannot be reduced to the minimum number of impedances using only series and parallel combinations. In general, Y-Δ and Δ-Y transformations must also be used. For some networks the extension of Y-Δ to star-polygon transformations may also be required.

For equivalence, the impedances between any pair of terminals must be the same for both networks, resulting in a set of three simultaneous equations. The equations below are expressed as resistances but apply equally to the general case with impedances.

==== Delta-to-star transformation equations ====
$$\begin{align}
R_a &=  \frac{R_\mathrm{ac}R_\mathrm{ab}}{R_\mathrm{ac} + R_\mathrm{ab} + R_\mathrm{bc}} \\
R_b &=  \frac{R_\mathrm{ab}R_\mathrm{bc}}{R_\mathrm{ac} + R_\mathrm{ab} + R_\mathrm{bc}} \\
R_c &=  \frac{R_\mathrm{bc}R_\mathrm{ac}}{R_\mathrm{ac} + R_\mathrm{ab} + R_\mathrm{bc}}
\end{align}$$

==== Star-to-delta transformation equations ====
$$\begin{align}
R_\mathrm{ac} &= \frac{R_a R_b + R_b R_c + R_c R_a}{R_b} \\
R_\mathrm{ab} &= \frac{R_a R_b + R_b R_c + R_c R_a}{R_c} \\
R_\mathrm{bc} &= \frac{R_a R_b + R_b R_c + R_c R_a}{R_a}
\end{align}$$

=== General form of network node elimination ===
The star-to-delta and series-resistor transformations are special cases of the general resistor network node elimination algorithm. Any node connected by N resistors (R_{1} … R_{N}) to nodes 1 … N can be replaced by $\tbinom{N}{2}$ resistors interconnecting the remaining N nodes. The resistance between any two nodes x, y is given by:

$$R_\mathrm{xy} = R_x R_y\sum_{i=1}^N \frac{1}{R_i}$$

For a star-to-delta (N = 3) this reduces to:

$$\begin{align}
R_\mathrm{ab} &= R_a R_b \left(\frac 1 R_a+\frac 1 R_b+\frac 1 R_c\right) = \frac{R_a R_b(R_a R_b + R_a R_c + R_b R_c)}{R_a R_b R_c} \\
&= \frac{R_a R_b + R_b R_c + R_c R_a}{R_c}
\end{align}$$

For a series reduction (N = 2) this reduces to:

$$R_\mathrm{ab} = R_a R_b \left(\frac 1 R_a+\frac 1 R_b\right) = \frac{R_a R_b(R_a + R_b)}{R_a R_b} = R_a + R_b$$

For a dangling resistor (N = 1) it results in the elimination of the resistor because $\tbinom{1}{2} = 0$.

=== Source transformation ===

A generator with an internal impedance (i.e. non-ideal generator) can be represented as either an ideal voltage generator or an ideal current generator plus the impedance. These two forms are equivalent and the transformations are given below. If the two networks are equivalent with respect to terminals ab, then V and I must be identical for both networks. Thus,

$V_\mathrm{s} = RI_\mathrm{s}\,\!$ or $I_\mathrm{s} = \frac{V_\mathrm{s}}{R}$

- Norton's theorem states that any two-terminal linear network can be reduced to an ideal current generator and a parallel impedance.
- Thévenin's theorem states that any two-terminal linear network can be reduced to an ideal voltage generator plus a series impedance.

== Simple networks ==
Some very simple networks can be analysed without the need to apply the more systematic approaches.

=== Voltage division of series components ===
Consider n impedances that are connected in series. The voltage $V_i$ across any impedance $Z_i$ is

$$V_i = Z_iI = \left( \frac{Z_i}{Z_1 + Z_2 + \cdots + Z_n} \right)V$$

=== Current division of parallel components ===
Consider n admittances that are connected in parallel. The current $I_i$ through any admittance $Y_i$ is

$$I_i = Y_iV = \left( \frac{Y_i}{Y_1 + Y_2 + \cdots + Y_n} \right)I$$

for $i = 1,2,...,n.$

==== Special case: Current division of two parallel components ====
$$I_1 = \left( \frac{Z_2}{Z_1 + Z_2} \right)I$$
$$I_2 = \left( \frac{Z_1}{Z_1 + Z_2} \right)I$$

== Nodal analysis ==
Nodal analysis uses the concept of a node voltage and considers the node voltages to be the unknown variables. For all nodes, except a chosen reference node, the node voltage is defined as the voltage drop from the node to the reference node. Therefore, there are N-1 node voltages for a circuit with N nodes.

In principle, nodal analysis uses Kirchhoff's current law (KCL) at N-1 nodes to get N-1 independent equations. Since equations generated with KCL are in terms of currents going in and out of nodes, these currents, if their values are not known, need to be represented by the unknown variables (node voltages). For some elements (such as resistors and capacitors) getting the element currents in terms of node voltages is trivial.

For some common elements where this is not possible, specialized methods are developed. For example, a concept called supernode is used for circuits with independent voltage sources.

1. Label all nodes in the circuit. Arbitrarily select any node as reference.
2. Define a voltage variable from every remaining node to the reference. These voltage variables must be defined as voltage rises with respect to the reference node.
3. Write a KCL equation for every node except the reference.
4. Solve the resulting system of equations.

== Mesh analysis ==
Mesh — a loop that does not contain an inner loop.

1. Count the number of “window panes” in the circuit. Assign a mesh current to each window pane.
2. Write a Kirchhoff's voltage law (KVL) equation for every mesh whose current is unknown.
3. Solve the resulting equations

== Superposition ==
In this method, the effect of each generator in turn is calculated. All the generators other than the one being considered are removed and either short-circuited in the case of voltage generators or open-circuited in the case of current generators. The total current through or the total voltage across a particular branch is then calculated by summing all the individual currents or voltages.

There is an underlying assumption to this method that the total current or voltage is a linear superposition of its parts. Therefore, the method cannot be used if non-linear components are present. Superposition of powers cannot be used to find total power consumed by elements even in linear circuits. Power varies according to the square of total voltage or current and the square of the sum is not generally equal to the sum of the squares. Total power in an element can be found by applying superposition to the voltages and current independently and then calculating power from the total voltage and current.

== Choice of method ==
Choice of method is to some extent a matter of taste. If the network is particularly simple or only a specific current or voltage is required then ad-hoc application of some simple equivalent circuits may yield the answer without recourse to the more systematic methods.

- Nodal analysis: The number of voltage variables, and hence simultaneous equations to solve, equals the number of nodes minus one. Every voltage source connected to the reference node reduces the number of unknowns and equations by one.
- Mesh analysis: The number of current variables, and hence simultaneous equations to solve, equals the number of meshes. Every current source in a mesh reduces the number of unknowns by one. Mesh analysis can only be used with networks which can be drawn as a planar network, that is, with no crossing components.
- Superposition is possibly the most conceptually simple method but rapidly leads to a large number of equations and messy impedance combinations as the network becomes larger.
- Effective medium approximations: For a network consisting of a high density of random resistors, an exact solution for each individual element may be impractical or impossible. Instead, the effective resistance and current distribution properties can be modelled in terms of graph measures and geometrical properties of networks.

== Transfer function ==
A transfer function expresses the relationship between an input and an output of a network. For resistive networks, this will always be a simple real number or an expression which boils down to a real number. Resistive networks are represented by a system of simultaneous algebraic equations. However, in the general case of linear networks, the network is represented by a system of simultaneous linear differential equations. In network analysis, rather than use the differential equations directly, it is usual practice to carry out a Laplace transform on them first and then express the result in terms of the Laplace parameter s, which in general is complex. This is described as working in the s-domain. Working with the equations directly would be described as working in the time (or t) domain because the results would be expressed as time varying quantities. The Laplace transform is the mathematical method of transforming between the s-domain and the t-domain.

This approach is standard in control theory and is useful for determining stability of a system, for instance, in an amplifier with feedback.

=== Two terminal component transfer functions ===
For two terminal components the transfer function, or more generally for non-linear elements, the constitutive equation, is the relationship between the current input to the device and the resulting voltage across it. The transfer function, Z(s), will thus have units of impedance, ohms. For the three passive components found in electrical networks, the transfer functions are;

Resistor	$Z(s)=R\,\!$
Inductor	$Z(s)=sL\,\!$
Capacitor	$Z(s)=\frac{1}{sC}$

For a network to which only steady ac signals are applied, s is replaced with jω and the more familiar values from ac network theory result.

Resistor	$Z(j\omega)=R\,\!$
Inductor	$Z(j\omega)=j\omega L\,\!$
Capacitor	$Z(j\omega)=\frac{1}{j\omega C}$

Finally, for a network to which only steady dc is applied, s is replaced with zero and dc network theory applies.

Resistor	$Z=R\,\!$
Inductor	$Z=0\,\!$
Capacitor	$Z=\infin \,\!$

=== Two port network transfer function ===
Transfer functions, in general, in control theory are given the symbol H(s). Most commonly in electronics, transfer function is defined as the ratio of output voltage to input voltage and given the symbol A(s), or more commonly (because analysis is invariably done in terms of sine wave response), A(jω), so that;
$$A(j\omega)=\frac{V_o}{V_i}$$

The A standing for attenuation, or amplification, depending on context. In general, this will be a complex function of jω, which can be derived from an analysis of the impedances in the network and their individual transfer functions. Sometimes the analyst is only interested in the magnitude of the gain and not the phase angle. In this case the complex numbers can be eliminated from the transfer function and it might then be written as;
$$A(\omega)=\left|{\frac{V_o}{V_i}}\right|$$

==== Two port parameters ====
The concept of a two-port network can be useful in network analysis as a black box approach to analysis. The behaviour of the two-port network in a larger network can be entirely characterised without necessarily stating anything about the internal structure. However, to do this it is necessary to have more information than just the A(jω) described above. It can be shown that four such parameters are required to fully characterise the two-port network. These could be the forward transfer function, the input impedance, the reverse transfer function (i.e., the voltage appearing at the input when a voltage is applied to the output) and the output impedance. There are many others (see the main article for a full listing), one of these expresses all four parameters as impedances. It is usual to express the four parameters as a matrix;
$$\begin{bmatrix}
V_1 \\
V_0
\end{bmatrix}
=
\begin{bmatrix}
z(j\omega)_{11} & z(j\omega)_{12} \\
z(j\omega)_{21} & z(j\omega)_{22}
\end{bmatrix}
\begin{bmatrix}
I_1 \\
I_0
\end{bmatrix}$$

The matrix may be abbreviated to a representative element;

$\left [z(j\omega) \right]$ or just $\left [z \right]$

These concepts are capable of being extended to networks of more than two ports. However, this is rarely done in reality because, in many practical cases, ports are considered either purely input or purely output. If reverse direction transfer functions are ignored, a multi-port network can always be decomposed into a number of two-port networks.

==== Distributed components ====
Where a network is composed of discrete components, analysis using two-port networks is a matter of choice, not essential. The network can always alternatively be analysed in terms of its individual component transfer functions. However, if a network contains distributed components, such as in the case of a transmission line, then it is not possible to analyse in terms of individual components since they do not exist. The most common approach to this is to model the line as a two-port network and characterise it using two-port parameters (or something equivalent to them). Another example of this technique is modelling the carriers crossing the base region in a high frequency transistor. The base region has to be modelled as distributed resistance and capacitance rather than lumped components.

==== Image analysis ====
Transmission lines and certain types of filter design use the image method to determine their transfer parameters. In this method, the behaviour of an infinitely long cascade connected chain of identical networks is considered. The input and output impedances and the forward and reverse transmission functions are then calculated for this infinitely long chain. Although the theoretical values so obtained can never be exactly realised in practice, in many cases they serve as a very good approximation for the behaviour of a finite chain as long as it is not too short.

== Time-based network analysis with simulation ==
Most analysis methods calculate the voltage and current values for static networks, which are circuits consisting of memoryless components only but have difficulties with complex dynamic networks. In general, the equations that describe the behaviour of a dynamic circuit are in the form of a differential-algebraic system of equations (DAEs). DAEs are challenging to solve and the methods for doing so are not yet fully understood and developed (as of 2010). Also, there is no general theorem that guarantees solutions to DAEs will exist and be unique. In special cases, the equation of the dynamic circuit will be in the form of an ordinary differential equation (ODE), which are easier to solve, since numerical methods for solving ODEs have a rich history, dating back to the late 1800s. One strategy for adapting ODE solution methods to DAEs is called direct discretization and is the method of choice in circuit simulation.

Simulation-based methods for time-based network analysis solve a circuit that is posed as an initial value problem (IVP). That is, the values of the components with memories (for example, the voltages on capacitors and currents through inductors) are given at an initial point of time t_{0}, and the analysis is done for the time $t_0\leq t\leq t_f$. Since finding numerical results for the infinite number of time points from t_{0} to t_{f} is not possible, this time period is discretized into discrete time instances, and the numerical solution is found for every instance. The time between the time instances is called the time step and can be fixed throughout the whole simulation or may be adaptive.

In an IVP, when finding a solution for time t_{n+1}, the solution for time t_{n} is already known. Then, temporal discretization is used to replace the derivatives with differences, such as
$$x'(t_{n+1}) \approx \frac{x_{n+1}-x_n}{h_{n+1}}$$
for the backward Euler method, where h_{n+1} is the time step.

If all circuit components were linear or the circuit was linearized beforehand, the equation system at this point is a system of linear equations and is solved with numerical linear algebra methods. Otherwise, it is a nonlinear algebraic equation system and is solved with nonlinear numerical methods such as Root-finding algorithms.

=== Comparison to other methods ===
Simulation methods are much more applicable than Laplace transform based methods, such as transfer functions, which only work for simple dynamic networks with capacitors and inductors. Also, the input signals to the network cannot be arbitrarily defined for Laplace transform-based methods.

== Non-linear networks ==
Most electronic designs are, in reality, non-linear. There are very few that do not include some semiconductor devices. These are invariably non-linear; the transfer function of an ideal semiconductor p-n junction is given by the very non-linear relationship;

$$i = I_o \left(e^{{v}/{V_T}}-1\right)$$

where;

- i and v are the instantaneous current and voltage.
- I_{o} is an arbitrary parameter called the reverse leakage current whose value depends on the construction of the device.
- V_{T} is a parameter proportional to temperature called the thermal voltage and equal to about 25mV at room temperature.

There are many other ways that non-linearity can appear in a network. All methods utilising linear superposition will fail when non-linear components are present. There are several options for dealing with non-linearity depending on the type of circuit and the information the analyst wishes to obtain.

=== Constitutive equations ===
The diode equation above is an example of an element constitutive equation of the general form,

$$f(v,i) = 0$$

This can be thought of as a non-linear resistor. The corresponding constitutive equations for non-linear inductors and capacitors are respectively;

$$f(v, \varphi) = 0$$
$$f(v, q) = 0$$

where f is any arbitrary function, φ is the stored magnetic flux and q is the stored charge.

=== Existence, uniqueness and stability ===
An important consideration in non-linear analysis is the question of uniqueness. For a network composed of linear components, there will always be one, and only one, unique solution for a given set of boundary conditions. This is not always the case in non-linear circuits. For instance, a linear resistor with a fixed current applied to it has only one solution for the voltage across it. On the other hand, the non-linear tunnel diode has up to three solutions for the voltage for a given current. That is, a particular solution for the current through the diode is not unique; there may be others, equally valid. In some cases, there may not be a solution at all: the question of existence of solutions must be considered.

Another important consideration is the question of stability. A particular solution may exist, but it may not be stable, rapidly departing from that point at the slightest stimulation. It can be shown that a network that is absolutely stable for all conditions must have one, and only one, solution for each set of conditions.

=== Methods ===
==== Boolean analysis of switching networks ====
A switching device is one where the non-linearity is utilised to produce two opposite states. CMOS devices in digital circuits, for instance, have their output connected to either the positive or the negative supply rail and are never found at anything in between, except during a transient period when the device is switching. Here, the non-linearity is designed to be extreme, and the analyst can take advantage of that fact. These kinds of networks can be analysed using Boolean algebra by assigning the two states ("on"/"off", "positive"/"negative" or whatever states are being used) to the Boolean constants "0" and "1".

The transients are ignored in this analysis, along with any slight discrepancy between the state of the device and the nominal state assigned to a Boolean value. For instance, Boolean "1" may be assigned to the state of +5V. The output of the device may be +4.5 V, but the analyst still considers this to be Boolean "1". Device manufacturers will usually specify a range of values in their data sheets that are to be considered undefined (i.e. the result will be unpredictable).

The transients are not entirely uninteresting to the analyst. The maximum rate of switching is determined by the speed of transition from one state to the other. Happily for the analyst, for many devices, most of the transition occurs in the linear portion of the device's transfer function and linear analysis can be applied to obtain at least an approximate answer.

It is mathematically possible to derive Boolean algebras that have more than two states. There is not too much use found for these in electronics, although three-state devices are passingly common.

==== Separation of bias and signal analyses ====
This technique is used where the operation of the circuit is to be essentially linear, but the devices used to implement it are non-linear. A transistor amplifier is an example of this kind of network. The essence of this technique is to separate the analysis into two parts. Firstly, the dc biases are analysed using some non-linear method. This establishes the quiescent operating point of the circuit. Secondly, the small signal characteristics of the circuit are analysed using linear network analysis. Examples of methods that can be used for both these stages are given below.

==== Graphical method of DC analysis ====
In a great many circuit designs, the DC bias is fed to a non-linear component via a resistor (or possibly a network of resistors). Since resistors are linear components, it is particularly easy to determine the quiescent operating point of the non-linear device from a graph of its transfer function. The method is as follows: from linear network analysis, the output transfer function (that is, output voltage against output current) is calculated for the network of resistors and the generator driving them. This will be a straight line (called the load line) and can readily be superimposed on the transfer function plot of the non-linear device. The point where the lines cross is the quiescent operating point.

Perhaps the easiest practical method is to calculate the (linear) network open circuit voltage and short circuit current and plot these on the transfer function of the non-linear device. The straight line joining these two points is the transfer function of the network.

In reality, the designer of the circuit would proceed in the reverse direction to that described. Starting from a plot provided in the manufacturer's data sheet for the non-linear device, the designer would choose the desired operating point and then calculate the linear component values required to achieve it.

It is still possible to use this method if the device being biased has its bias fed through another device, which is itself non-linear, a diode for instance. In this case, however, the plot of the network transfer function onto the device being biased would no longer be a straight line and is consequently more tedious to do.

==== Small signal equivalent circuit ====
This method can be used where the deviation of the input and output signals in a network stays within a substantially linear portion of the non-linear device's transfer function, or else is so small that the curve of the transfer function can be considered linear. Under a set of these specific conditions, the non-linear device can be represented by an equivalent linear network. It must be remembered that this equivalent circuit is entirely notional and only valid for the small signal deviations. It is entirely inapplicable to the DC biasing of the device.

For a simple two-terminal device, the small signal equivalent circuit may be no more than two components. A resistance equal to the slope of the v/i curve at the operating point (called the dynamic resistance), and tangent to the curve. A generator, because this tangent will not, in general, pass through the origin. With more terminals, more complicated equivalent circuits are required.

A popular form of specifying the small signal equivalent circuit amongst transistor manufacturers is to use the two-port network parameters known as [h] parameters. These are a matrix of four parameters, as with the [z] parameters, but in the case of the [h] parameters, they are a hybrid mixture of impedances, admittances, current gains and voltage gains. In this model, the three-terminal transistor is considered to be a two-port network, one of its terminals being common to both ports. The [h] parameters are quite different depending on which terminal is chosen as the common one. The most important parameter for transistors is usually the forward current gain, h_{21}, in the common emitter configuration. This is designated h_{fe} on data sheets.

The small signal equivalent circuit in terms of two-port parameters leads to the concept of dependent generators. That is, the value of a voltage or current generator depends linearly on a voltage or current elsewhere in the circuit. For instance, the [z] parameter model leads to dependent voltage generators as shown in this diagram;

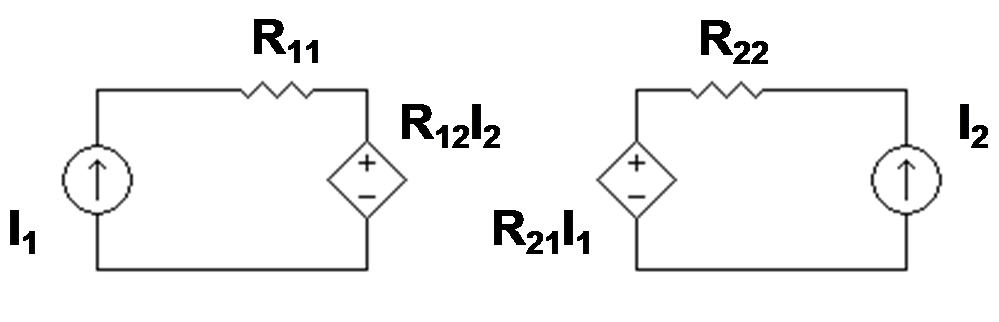
[z] parameter equivalent circuit showing dependent voltage generators

There will always be dependent generators in a two-port parameter equivalent circuit. This applies to the [h] parameters as well as to the [z] and any other kind. These dependencies must be preserved when developing the equations in a larger linear network analysis.

==== Piecewise linear method ====
In this method, the transfer function of the non-linear device is broken up into regions. Each of these regions is approximated by a straight line. Thus, the transfer function will be linear up to a particular point where there will be a discontinuity. Past this point, the transfer function will again be linear but with a different slope.

A well-known application of this method is the approximation of the transfer function of a pn junction diode. The transfer function of an ideal diode has been given at the top of this (non-linear) section. However, this formula is rarely used in network analysis, a piecewise approximation being used instead. It can be seen that the diode current rapidly diminishes to -I_{o} as the voltage falls. This current, for most purposes, is so small it can be ignored. With increasing voltage, the current increases exponentially. The diode is modelled as an open circuit up to the knee of the exponential curve, then past this point as a resistor equal to the bulk resistance of the semiconducting material.

The commonly accepted values for the transition point voltage are 0.7V for silicon devices and 0.3V for germanium devices. An even simpler model of the diode, sometimes used in switching applications, is a short circuit for forward voltages and an open circuit for reverse voltages.

The model of a forward-biased PN junction having an approximately constant 0.7V is also a much-used approximation for transistor base-emitter junction voltage in amplifier design.

The piecewise method is similar to the small signal method in that linear network analysis techniques can only be applied if the signal stays within certain bounds. If the signal crosses a discontinuity point, then the model is no longer valid for linear analysis purposes. The model does have the advantage over small signal, however, in that it is equally applicable to signal and DC bias. These can therefore both be analysed in the same operations and will be linearly superimposable.

=== Time-varying components ===
In linear analysis, the components of the network are assumed to be unchanging, but in some circuits this does not apply, such as sweep oscillators, voltage controlled amplifiers, and variable equalisers. In many circumstances, the change in component value is periodic. A non-linear component excited with a periodic signal, for instance, can be represented as a periodically varying linear component. Sidney Darlington disclosed a method of analysing such periodic time-varying circuits. He developed canonical circuit forms which are analogous to the canonical forms of Ronald M. Foster and Wilhelm Cauer used for analysing linear circuits.

=== Vector circuit theory ===
Generalization of circuit theory based on scalar quantities to vectorial currents is a necessity for newly evolving circuits such as spin circuits. Generalized circuit variables consist of four components: scalar current and vector spin current in x, y, and z directions. The voltages and currents each become vector quantities with conductance described as a 4x4 spin conductance matrix.

== See also ==
- Bartlett's bisection theorem
- Kirchhoff's circuit laws
- Millman's theorem
- Modified nodal analysis
- Ohm's law
- Reciprocity (electrical networks)
- Tellegen's theorem
- Symbolic circuit analysis
