= Voltage source =

Two-terminal electrical device able to maintain a fixed voltage

A schematic diagram of a voltage source, V, driving a resistor, R, and creating a current I

A voltage source is a two-terminal device which can maintain a fixed voltage. An ideal voltage source can maintain the fixed voltage independent of the load resistance or the output current. However, a real-world voltage source cannot supply unlimited current.

A voltage source is the dual of a current source. Real-world sources of electrical energy, such as batteries and generators, can be modeled for analysis purposes as a combination of an ideal voltage source and additional combinations of impedance elements.

== Ideal voltage sources ==
An ideal voltage source is a two-terminal device that maintains a fixed voltage drop across its terminals. It is often used as a mathematical abstraction that simplifies the analysis of real electric circuits. If the voltage across an ideal voltage source can be specified independently of any other variable in a circuit, it is called an independent voltage source. Conversely, if the voltage across an ideal voltage source is determined by some other voltage or current in a circuit, it is called a dependent or controlled voltage source. A mathematical model of an amplifier will include dependent voltage sources whose magnitude is governed by some fixed relation to an input signal, for example. In the analysis of faults on electrical power systems, the whole network of interconnected sources and transmission lines can be usefully replaced by an ideal (AC) voltage source and a single equivalent impedance.

Ideal Voltage Source	Ideal Current Source
Controlled Voltage Source	Controlled Current Source
Battery of cells	Single cell

Symbols used for sources

The internal resistance of an ideal voltage source is zero; it is able to supply or absorb any amount of current. The current through an ideal voltage source is completely determined by the external circuit. When connected to an open circuit, there is zero current and thus zero power. When connected to a load resistance, the current through the source approaches infinity as the load resistance approaches zero (a short circuit). Thus, an ideal voltage source can supply unlimited power.

If two ideal independent voltage source are directly connected in parallel, they must have exactly the same voltage; Otherwise, it creates a fallacy in logic, similar to writing down the equation $1=2$.

If two ideal independent voltage sources are connected in parallel via a resistor, the source with the lower voltage becomes a consumer. If the source voltages are equal, there is zero current and thus zero power.

Voltage sources in parallel shares the burden of current: If an exact duplicate of voltage is connected in parallel to the original one, either one of them will provide half of the electric current that the original voltage source would provide. For the remainder of the circuit, nothing has changed: These two voltage sources together provide the same voltage, and the same current as the original one alone.

No real voltage source is ideal; all have a non-zero effective internal resistance, and none can supply unlimited current. However, the internal resistance of a real voltage source is effectively modeled in linear circuit analysis by combining a non-zero resistance in series with an ideal voltage source (a Thévenin equivalent circuit).

== Comparison between voltage and current sources ==
Most sources of electrical energy (the mains, a battery) are modeled as voltage sources. An ideal voltage source provides no energy when it is loaded by an open circuit (i.e. an infinite impedance), but approaches infinite energy and current when the load resistance approaches zero (a short circuit). Such a theoretical device would have a zero ohm output impedance in series with the source. A real-world voltage source has a very low, but non-zero internal resistance and output impedance, often much less than 1 ohm.

Conversely, a current source provides a constant current, as long as the load connected to the source terminals has sufficiently low impedance. An ideal current source would provide no energy to a short circuit and approach infinite energy and voltage as the load resistance approaches infinity (an open circuit). An ideal current source has an infinite output impedance in parallel with the source. A real-world current source has a very high, but finite output impedance. In the case of transistor current sources, impedance of a few megohms (at low frequencies) is typical.

Since no ideal sources of either variety exist (all real-world examples have finite and non-zero source impedance), any current source can be considered as a voltage source with the same source impedance and vice versa. Voltage sources and current sources are sometimes said to be duals of each other and any non ideal source can be converted from one to the other by applying Norton's theorem or Thévenin's theorem.

== See also ==
- Dependent source
- Bandgap voltage reference
- Voltage divider
- Voltage reference
- Voltage regulator
