= Sergei Alexander Schelkunoff =

- Born: January 27, 1897; Samara, Russia
- Died: May 2, 1992 (aged 95); Hightstown, New Jersey, U.S.
- Education: Columbia University
- Known for: Schelkunoff equivalence principle
- Awards: IEEE Morris N. Liebmann Memorial Award from the Institute of Radio Engineers, Franklin Institute's Stuart Ballantine Medal
- Scientific career
- Fields: Mathematics; Electromagnetism; Antenna theory
- Workplaces: Bell Telephone Laboratories

Sergei Alexander Schelkunoff (Russian: Сергей Александрович Щелкунов; January 27, 1897 – May 2, 1992), who published as S. A. Schelkunoff, was a distinguished mathematician, electrical engineer, and electromagnetism theorist who made noted contributions to antenna theory.

== Biography ==
Schelkunoff was born in Samara, Russia in 1897, attended the University of Moscow before being drafted in 1917. He crossed Siberia into Manchuria and then Japan before settling in Seattle in 1921. There he received bachelor's and master's degrees in mathematics from the State College of Washington, now Washington State University, and in 1928 received his Ph.D. from Columbia University for his dissertation On Certain Properties of the Metrical and Generalized Metrical Groups in Linear Spaces of n Dimension.

After receiving his degree, Schelkunoff joined Western Electric's research wing, which became Bell Laboratories. In 1933 he and Sally P. Mead began analysis of waveguide propagation discovered analytically by their colleague George C. Southworth. Their analysis uncovered the transverse modes. Schelkunoff appears to have been the first to notice the important practical consequences of the fact that attenuation in the TE01 mode decays inversely with the 3/2 power of the frequency. In 1935 he and his colleagues reported that coaxial cable, then new, could transmit television pictures or up to 200 telephone conversations.

During his 35 year career at Bell Labs, Schelkunoff's research included radar, electromagnetic wave propagation in the atmosphere and in microwave guides, short-wave radio, broad-band antennas, and grounding. He taught for five years at Columbia University, and later served as assistant director of mathematical research and assistant vice president for university relations. He retired from Columbia U. in 1965, and served as a consultant on magnetrons for the United States Naval Station at San Diego.

Schelkunoff received 15 patents, the IEEE Morris N. Liebmann Memorial Award from the Institute of Radio Engineers (1942), and the Franklin Institute's Stuart Ballantine Medal (1949). He died on 2 May 1992, in Hightstown, New Jersey.

== Selected works ==
=== Articles ===
- Schelkunoff, S.A. (1934). "The electromagnetic theory of coaxial transmission lines and cylindrical shields". Bell Labs Technical Journal. 13 (4): 532–579. doi:10.1002/j.1538-7305.1934.tb00679.x.
- Schelkunoff, S.A. (November 1937). "Electromagnetic waves in conducting tubes". Physical Review. 52 (10): 1078. Bibcode:1937PhRv...52.1078S. doi:10.1103/PhysRev.52.1078.
- Schelkunoff, S.A. (1939). "On diffraction and radiation of electromagnetic waves". Physical Review. 56 (4): 308. Bibcode:1939PhRv...56..308S. doi:10.1103/PhysRev.56.308.
- Schelkunoff, S.A. (1943). "A mathematical theory of linear arrays". Bell Labs Technical Journal. 22 (1): 80–107. doi:10.1002/j.1538-7305.1943.tb01306.x.
- Schelkunoff, S.A. (1943). "The impedance of a transverse wire in a rectangular wave guide". Quarterly of Applied Mathematics. 1: 78–85. doi:10.1090/qam/8051. MR 0008051.
- Schelkunoff, S.A. (1944). "Impedance concept in wave guides". Quarterly of Applied Mathematics. 2: 1–15. doi:10.1090/qam/11833. MR 0011833.
- Schelkunoff, S.A. (1944). "Proposed symbols for the modified cosine and exponential integrals". Quarterly of Applied Mathematics. 2: 90. doi:10.1090/qam/10012. MR 0010012.
- Schelkunoff, S.A. (1944). "On waves in bent pipes". Quarterly of Applied Mathematics. 2 (2): 171–172. doi:10.1090/qam/10690. MR 0010690.
- Schelkunoff, S.A. (1944). "On the antenna problem" (PDF). Quarterly of Applied Mathematics. 1 (4): 354–355. doi:10.1090/qam/99998.
- Schelkunoff, S.A. (1946). "Solution of linear and slightly nonlinear differential equations". Quarterly of Applied Mathematics. 3 (4): 348–355. doi:10.1090/qam/14549. MR 0014549.
- Schelkunoff, S.A. (1955). "Conversion of Maxwell's equations into generalized telegraphist's equations". Bell Labs Technical Journal. 34 (5): 995–1043. doi:10.1002/j.1538-7305.1955.tb03787.x.

=== Books ===
- Schelkunoff, S.A. (1943). Electromagnetic waves. New York, NY: D. van Nostrand Company.
- Schelkunoff, S.A. (1948). Applied Mathematics for Engineers and Scientists. New York, NY: D. van Nostrand Company.
- Schelkunoff, S.A. (1952). Advanced Antenna Theory. New York, NY: John Wiley & Sons.
- Schelkunoff, S.A.; Friis, H.T. (1952). Antennas: Theory and practice. Bell Telephone Laboratories. New York, NY: John Wiley & Sons.
- Schelkunoff, S.A. (1963). Electromagnetic Fields. Blaisdell Publishing Company / A Division of Random House.

=== Patents ===
- U.S. patent 2,372,228 – Ultra short wave radio system – Bell Laboratories

== See also ==
- List of textbooks in electromagnetism

== Other sources ==
- Lambert, Bruce (17 May 1992). "S.A. Schelkunoff, 95, researcher and developer of coaxial cable". The New York Times (obituary).
- Bray, John (2002). Innovation and the Communications Revolution. The Institution of Electrical Engineers. pp. 220–221. ISBN 0-85296-218-5.
- "Sergei Alexander Schelkunoff". IEEE Transactions on Microwave Theory and Techniques. 5 (3): 172. July 1957. doi:10.1109/TMTT.1957.1125132.
- "Schelkunoff". RootsWeb. Social Security information.
