= L pad =

Impedance matching circuit element

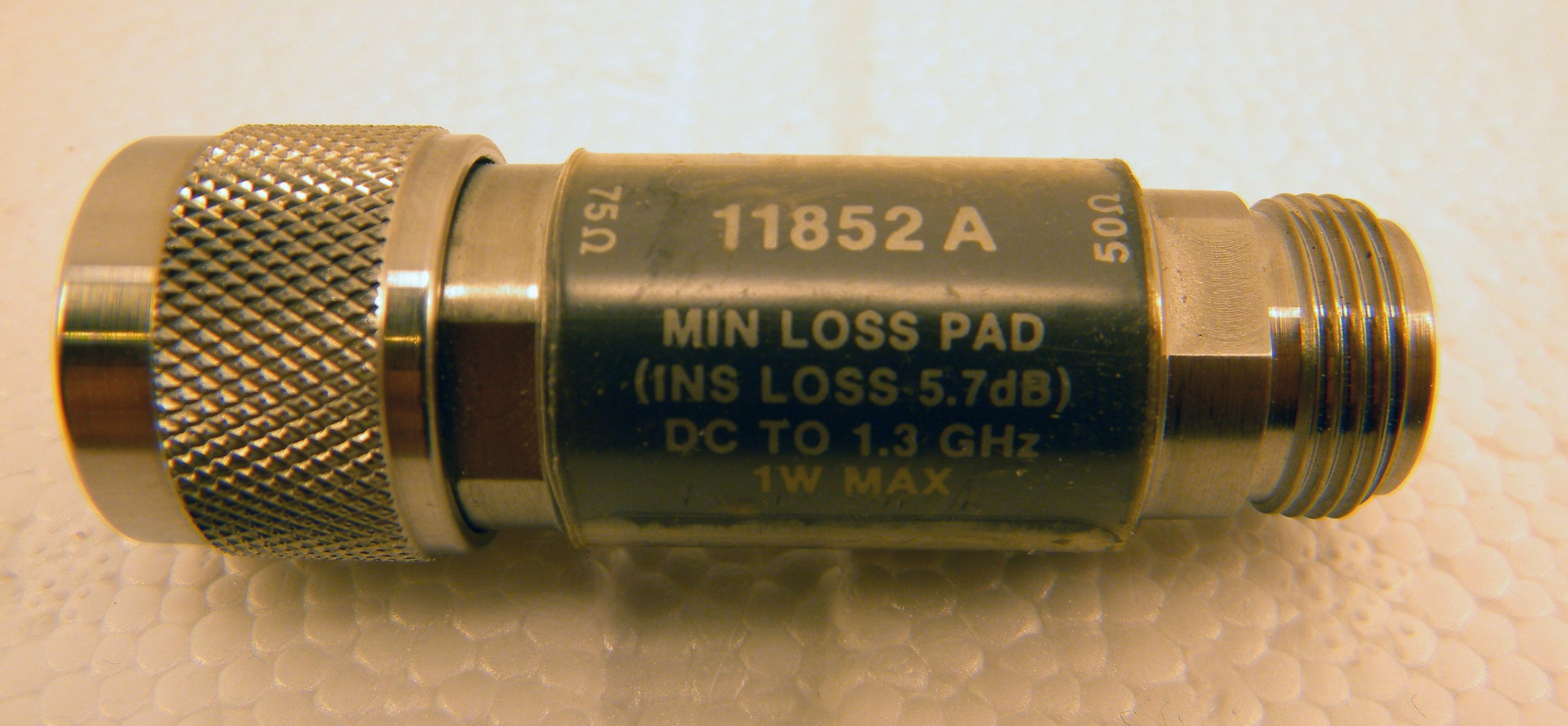
An actual wide-band L pad used to match 50 ohms to 75 ohms.

An L pad is a network composed of two impedances that typically resemble the letter capital "L" when drawn on a schematic circuit diagram. It is commonly used for attenuation and for impedance matching.

== Speaker L pad ==
A speaker L pad is a special configuration of rheostats used to control volume while maintaining a constant load impedance on the output of the audio amplifier. It consists of a parallel and a series rheostat connected in an "L" configuration. As one increases in resistance, the other decreases, thus maintaining a constant impedance, at least in one direction. To maintain constant impedance in both directions, a "T" pad must be used. In loudspeaker systems having a crossover network, it is necessary to maintain impedance to the crossover; this avoids shifting the crossover point.

A constant-impedance load is important in the case of vacuum tube power amplifiers, because such amplifiers do not work as efficiently when terminated into an impedance greatly different than their specified output impedance. Maintaining constant impedance is less important In the case solid state electronics.

In high frequency horns, the L Pad is seen by the crossover, not the amp. L pads may not necessarily use continuously variable rheostats, but instead a multi-position rotating selector switch wired to resistors on the back. Tapped transformers are not L pads; they are autoformers. L pads can also be used at line level, mostly in pro applications.

== Audio-frequency (AF) operation ==
The L pad attenuates the signal by having two separate rheostats connected in an "L" configuration (hence the name). One rheostat is connected in series with the loudspeaker and, as the resistance of this rheostat increases, less power is coupled into the loudspeaker and the loudness of sound produced by the loudspeaker decreases. The second rheostat is connected between the input and ground (earth). As the first rheostat increases in resistance, the second rheostat decreases in resistance, keeping the load impedance (presented at the input of the L pad) constant. The second rheostat usually has a special taper (function of resistance versus rotation) to accommodate the need for constant input impedance.

== Radio-frequency (RF) operation ==
In RF (radio frequency) applications, the L network is the basis of many common impedance matching circuits, such as the pi network employed in amplifiers and the T network that is common in transmatches.

The L network relies on a procedure known as series-parallel transformation. For every series combination of resistance, R_{S}, and reactance, X_{S}, there exists a parallel combination of R_{P} and X_{P} that acts identically to the voltage applied across the series combination. In other words, the series components and the parallel components provide the same impedance at their terminals. The transformation ratio is the ratio of the input and output impedances of the impedance matching network.

The series-parallel transformation allows the input impedance to be dropped down to lower impedances while sustaining a voltage across the circuit. This system works in reverse as well. The equations needed for this transformation are as follows:

$$Q = \frac{X_S}{R_S} = \frac{R_P}{X_P} = \sqrt{\frac{R_P}{R_S} - 1}$$

$$R_P = R_S (Q^2 + 1)$$

$$X_S = Q R_S$$

For the resistance R_{s} and reactance X_{s} in series, R_{p} and X_{p} exist as a parallel combination. One simply needs to know the input impedance R_{p} and to choose the output impedance R_{s}. Or conversely know R_{s} and choose R_{p}. Keep in mind that R_{p} must be larger than R_{s}. Because reactance is frequency dependent the L network will only transform the impedances at one frequency.

Inclusion of two L networks back to back creates what is known as a T-network. T-networks work well for matching an even greater range of impedances.

== Impedance matching ==
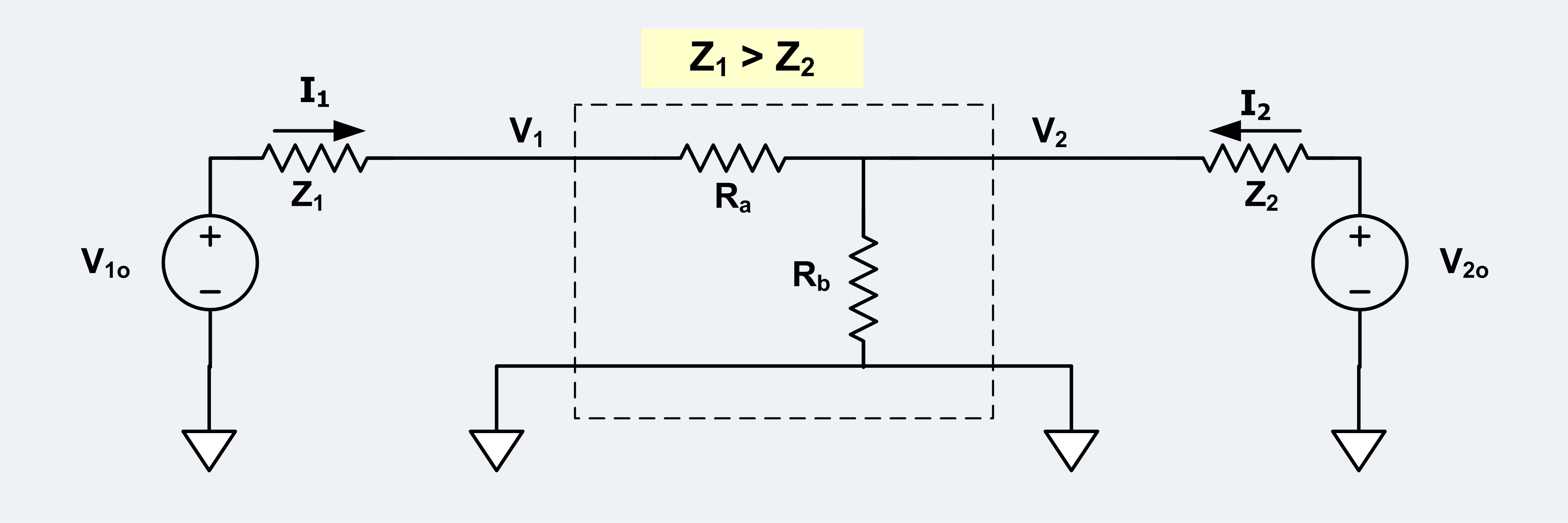
An L pad used to match a source to a load of a different impedance.

If a source and load are both resistive (i.e. Z1 and Z2 have zero or very small imaginary part) then a resistive L pad can be used to match them to each other. As shown, either side of the L pad can be the source or load, but the Z1 side must be the side with the higher impedance.

$$R_b = \frac {Z_2} {\sqrt {1 - Z_2/Z_1  } }    \,$$

$$R_a = \frac {Z_1 Z_2} {R_b}    \,$$

There is an inherent insertion loss $Loss = 10 \log { \frac { P_{pad} + P_{load}} { P_{load} } } = -20 \log { \frac { 2 \sqrt{Z_1/Z_2} } { 1 + (R_a+Z_1)(R_b+Z_2)/(R_bZ_2) } } \,$

where $P_{load} \,$ = power dissipated by load and $P_{pad} \,$ = power dissipated by the pad resistors. Large positive numbers means loss is large.

The loss is a monotonic function to the impedance ratio. Higher ratios require higher loss.

== Application notes ==
Speaker L pads are designed to match the impedance of the speaker, so they were commonly available with 4, 8, and 16 Ω impedances.

== See also ==
- Π pad
- T pad
