= Nominal watt =

Nominal wattage is used to simplify the measurement of the efficiency of a loudspeaker.

The impedance of a loudspeaker varies with frequency. This means that if different sine wave tones are fed into the loudspeaker at the same voltage (or the same current), the amount of electric power consumed will vary.

By convention, loudspeakers are designed to generate the same sound pressure level (SPL) at the listener for the same voltage at varying frequencies - regardless of the variation in electric power. This permits a loudspeaker to be used with an amplifier having a low internal impedance and a flat frequency response is realized for the combined amplifier/loudspeaker system.

However, an amplifier with a low internal impedance delivers more electrical output power when the load impedance reduces (until the impedances become approximately matched). Such high power levels could cause damage to either the amplifier or the amplifier's power supply, or the circuit connected to the amplifier's output (including the loudspeaker).

Therefore, an additional convention exists whereby loudspeaker manufacturers specify a conservative estimate of the average impedance that the loudspeaker will present while playing typical music. This is called the nominal impedance. Amplifiers can therefore be safely specified to operate into a load that has this nominal impedance (or higher, but not lower).

Typical nominal impedances for speakers include 4, 6, 8 and 16Ω (ohms), with 4Ω being most common in in-car loudspeakers, and 8Ω being most common elsewhere. A loudspeaker with an 8Ω nominal impedance may exhibit actual impedances ranging from approximately 5 to 100Ω depending on frequency.

In this context, the nominal wattage is the theoretical electric power that would be transferred from amplifier to speaker if the loudspeaker was actually exhibiting its nominal impedance. The actual electric power may vary from about twice the nominal power down to less than one tenth.

Loudspeaker efficiency is measured with respect to nominal power in order to emulate the situation outlined above where a low internal impedance amplifier is used with a loudspeaker. The convention is to supply one nominal watt during testing. If the nominal impedance is 4 ohms, the voltage would be 2 volts. If the nominal impedance is 8Ω, the voltage would be 2.83 volts.
