= Impedance bridging =

Load measures the source's voltage without affecting it

In audio engineering and sound recording, a high impedance bridging, voltage bridging, or simply bridging connection is one in which the load impedance is much larger than the source impedance. The load measures the source's voltage while minimally drawing current or affecting it.

== Explanation ==

When the output of a device (consisting of the voltage source V_{S} and output impedance Z_{S} in illustration) is connected to the input of another device (the load impedance Z_{L} in the illustration), these two impedances form a voltage divider:

$$V_L = \frac{Z_L}{Z_S + Z_L} V_S \, .$$

One can maximize the signal level V_{L} by using a voltage source whose output impedance Z_{S} is as small as possible and by using a receiving device whose input impedance Z_{L} is as large as possible. When $Z_L \gg Z_S$ (typically by at least ten times), this is called a bridging connection and has a number of effects including:

- Advantages:
  - Reduces the 6dB attenuation incurred by impedance matching, which helps by reducing the amount of make-up amplification required and by maintaining a high signal-to-noise ratio. However a transformer can be used instead to match impedance and provide better signal-to-noise. And the 6dB attenuation can be easily be made up in the amplifier.
  - Facilitates connecting multiple loads to the same source.
  - Reduces current drawn from the source device, which helps avoid wasting power and helps reduce distortion. Less current through the wire also reduces resistive loss.
- Disadvantages:
  - Increasing Z_{L} possibly increases environmental noise pickup since the combined parallel impedance of Z_{S} || Z_{L} (dominated by Z_{S}) increases slightly, which makes it easier for stray noise to drive the signal node.
  - Signal reflection from the impedance change. However, for audio frequencies, a quarter wavelength at 20 kHz is approximately 2500 meters, so audio circuits in studios never become true transmission lines.

== Applications ==
=== Limit attenuation of voltage signal ===
Impedance bridging is typically used to avoid unnecessary voltage attenuation and current draw in line or mic level connections where the source device has an unchangeable output impedance Z_{S}. Fortunately, the input impedance Z_{L} of modern op-amp circuits (and many old vacuum tube circuits) is often naturally much higher than the output impedance of these signal sources and thus are naturally-suited for impedance bridging when receiving and amplifying these voltage signals. The inherently lower output impedance of modern circuit designs facilitate impedance bridging.

For devices with very high output impedances, such as with a guitar pickup or a high-Z mic, a DI box can help with impedance bridging by converting the high output impedances to a lower impedance so as to not require the receiving device to have outrageously high input impedance (which would suffer drawbacks such as increased noise in long cable runs). The DI box is placed close to the source device, so any long cables can be attached to the output of the DI box (which usually also converts unbalanced signals to balanced signals to further increase noise immunity).

=== Increase electrical efficiency ===
The red curve is the power in the load, normalized relative to its maximum possible (which occurs when R_{L} == R_{S}). The dark blue curve is the power transfer efficiency η, which asymptotically approaches the maximum of 100% as the ratio $R_\mathrm{L}/R_\mathrm{S}$ increases.

As explained in Maximum power transfer theorem § Maximizing power transfer versus power efficiency, the efficiency η of delivering power to a purely restive load impedance of R_{L} from a voltage source with a purely restive output impedance of R_{S} is:
$$\eta = \frac{1}{1 + R_\mathrm{S} / R_\mathrm{L}} \, .$$
This efficiency can be increased using impedance bridging, by decreasing R_{S} and/or by increasing R_{L}.

However, to instead transfer the maximum power from the source to the load, impedance matching should be used, according to the maximum power transfer theorem.

== See also ==
- Damping factor
- Impedance matching
