= Line isolation transformer =

Safety device for telephones

A line isolation transformer for telephone use is a special type of impedance matching transformer that is used to couple telephone land lines to subscriber equipment to prevent dangerous common mode voltages from appearing on the line. It has a specific 600Ω input impedance which matches the telephone equipment.

A "wet" type will maintain its characteristics while passing the DC current needed to seize the telephone line (signal off-hook to the central office). It is also made with a gapped magnetic core that is not used in normal transformers. A "dry" isolation transformer need not carry DC current and an alternative DC path would be provided.

== See also ==
- Isolation transformer
