= Sallie Pero Mead =

American mathematician and engineer

Sallie P. Mead
- Born: Sallie Eugena Pero; October 1, 1893; Manhattan, New York, US
- Died: 1981 (aged 87–88); New Jersey, US
- Occupations: Computer, mathematician, engineer
- Years active: 1915–1958
- Known for: Contributions to radar technology and waveguide development
- Spouse(s): Charles Edwin Mead (m. 1924, died 1934), Chester E. Grant (m. 1938)

Sallie P. Mead (born Sallie Eugena Pero, October 1, 1893 – April 1981) was an American mathematician and engineer known for her contributions to radar technology and the development of waveguides at the American Telephone and Telegraph Company's development and research arm (AT&T D&R).

== Early life ==
Sallie P. Mead was born on October 1, 1893, in Manhattan, New York, to Robert R. Pero and Lillian M. Foggin. She began studying at Barnard College in 1909 and graduated in 1913, earning the highest honors in mathematics and winning the Barnard's Kohn Mathematical Prize. She continued her studies at Columbia University, where she earned a master's degree in mathematics. Her master's essay, titled "Linear Transformations and the Theory of the Tetrahedron" focused on the application of linear transformations and the rotation group of the tetrahedron to the solution of general quartic equations.

== Career ==
Mead received a license to teach mathematics as a substitute in New York City schools, with her first assignment at Evander Childs High School in the Bronx. By June 1915, she had joined AT&T's Western Union building on Broadway, hired by George Ashley Campbell as a "computer" to work on transmission probability problems. In 1923, Campbell credited Mead in a technical paper for her meticulous work on the exponential Poisson distribution.

=== Transition to engineer ===
In 1919, Pero transitioned from "computer" to "engineer" at AT&T D&R's Transmission Engineering unit under supervisor John Renshaw Carson. Mead developed expertise in the mathematics of transmission through cables, wires, and conducting tubes, especially those with circular cross sections. In 1924, she applied for a patent on a "distortion compensator," becoming the first woman at AT&T to hold a patent upon its granting in 1929. Mead earned six patents throughout her career. She became the first woman to publish in the Bell System Technical Journal and went on to author six BSTJ articles.

=== Contributions to waveguide development ===
In the early 1930s, Mead was assigned as an analyst to provide mathematical support to George Southworth's development of waveguides, crucial for microwave radar technology in World War II. Along with Sergei Schelkunoff, Mead rediscovered Lord Rayleigh's findings on waveguide cutoff frequencies, and their work went on to extend Rayleigh's results to include metal attenuation losses. Southworth himself was unsure which of the two was first to describe the effect. The work of Mead and Shelkunoff on the attenuation of the TE01 mode led to significant advancements in microwave communications. Mead retired in 1958, remarking that she looked forward to having more time study mathematics and Russian.

== Personal life ==
Mead married Charles Edwin Mead in 1924, who died in 1934. She married Chester E. Grant in 1938 but continued to use the name Sallie P. Mead professionally.

== Later years and legacy ==
During World War II, Mead contributed to the development of fire-control systems. Post-war, she conducted probabilistic studies of communication traffic in the Traffic Department until her retirement in 1958. Mead died in April 1981 in New Jersey.

== Awards and honors ==
- Barnard's Kohn Mathematical Prize (1913)
- First woman at AT&T to hold a patent (1929)
- Member of the American Mathematical Society (1923)

== Selected works ==
=== Articles ===
- Mead, Sallie Pero (April 1928). "Phase distortion and phase distortion correction". Bell System Technical Journal. 7 (2). Oxford, UK: American Telephone and Telegraph Company: 195–224. doi:10.1002/j.1538-7305.1928.tb01223.x. ISSN 0005-8580.
- Mead, Sallie Pero (April 1925). "Wave propagation over parallel tubular conductors: The alternating current resistance". Bell System Technical Journal. 4 (2). Oxford, UK: American Telephone and Telegraph Company: 327–338. doi:10.1002/j.1538-7305.1925.tb00951.x. ISSN 0005-8580.
- Carson, John R.; Mead, Sallie P.; Schelkunoff, S. A. (April 1936). "Hyper-frequency wave guides - Mathematical theory". Bell System Technical Journal. 15 (2). Oxford, UK: American Telephone and Telegraph Company: 310–333. doi:10.1002/j.1538-7305.1936.tb00734.x. ISSN 0005-8580.
