= Flap attenuator =

Waveguide component

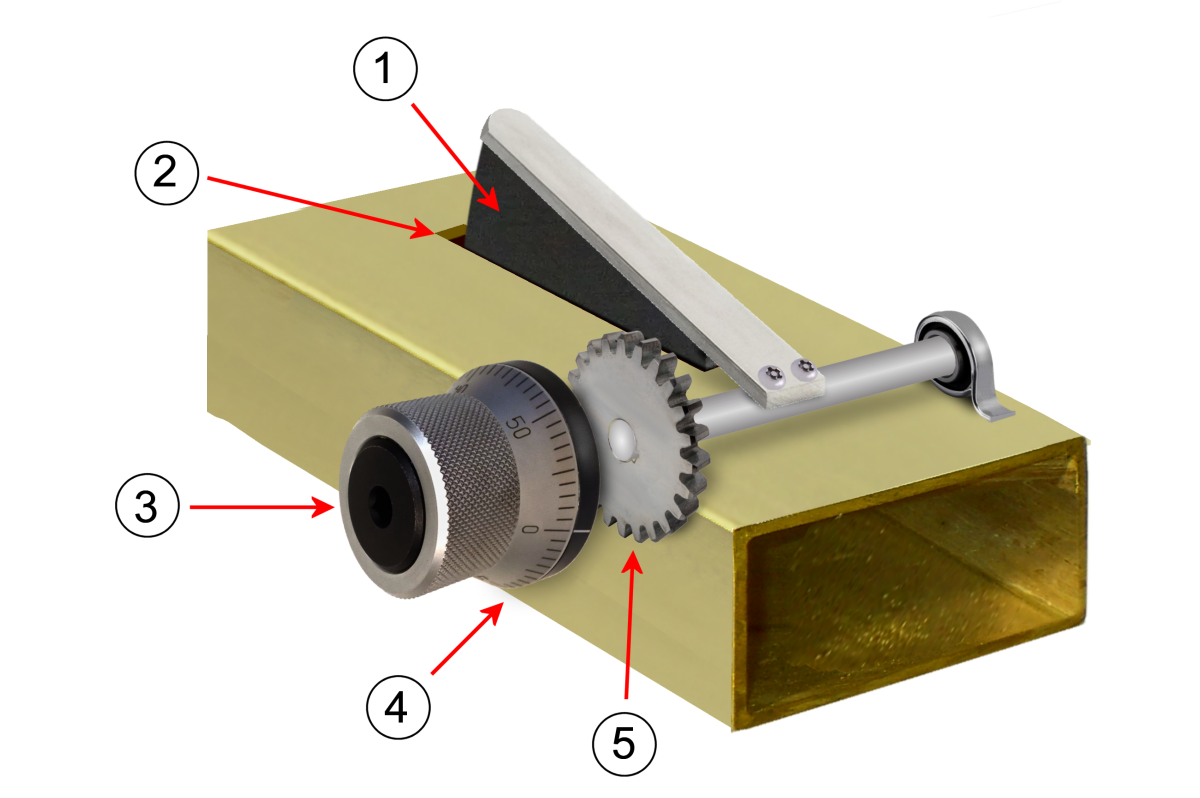
Schematic of a flap-type waveguide attenuator: 1) resistive cord, 2) slot in waveguide, 3) adjusting knob, 4) dial, 5) reduction gear 4:1

The flap attenuator or resistive-card attenuator is a flap-type waveguide attenuator that allows for precise and continuous attenuation of electromagnetic waves traveling through a rectangle waveguide.

It comprises a thin, disk-shaped attenuation material that extends through a longitudinal slot in the middle of the wider side of the waveguide into the inner space of the waveguide. The extent of the insertion is variable, and the attenuation can be made approximately linear with the insertion by properly shaping the resistance card. A shape with as few sharp edges as possible is considered to minimize reflections. As a rule, thin semicircular panes are preferred.

The attenuation can be typically up to 30 decibels. In the millimeter wave range, it's possible to achieve up to 40 dB. The attenuation is frequency-dependent, resulting in less attenuation of harmonics for complex signals.
