= George Clark Southworth =

American radio engineer (1890-1972)

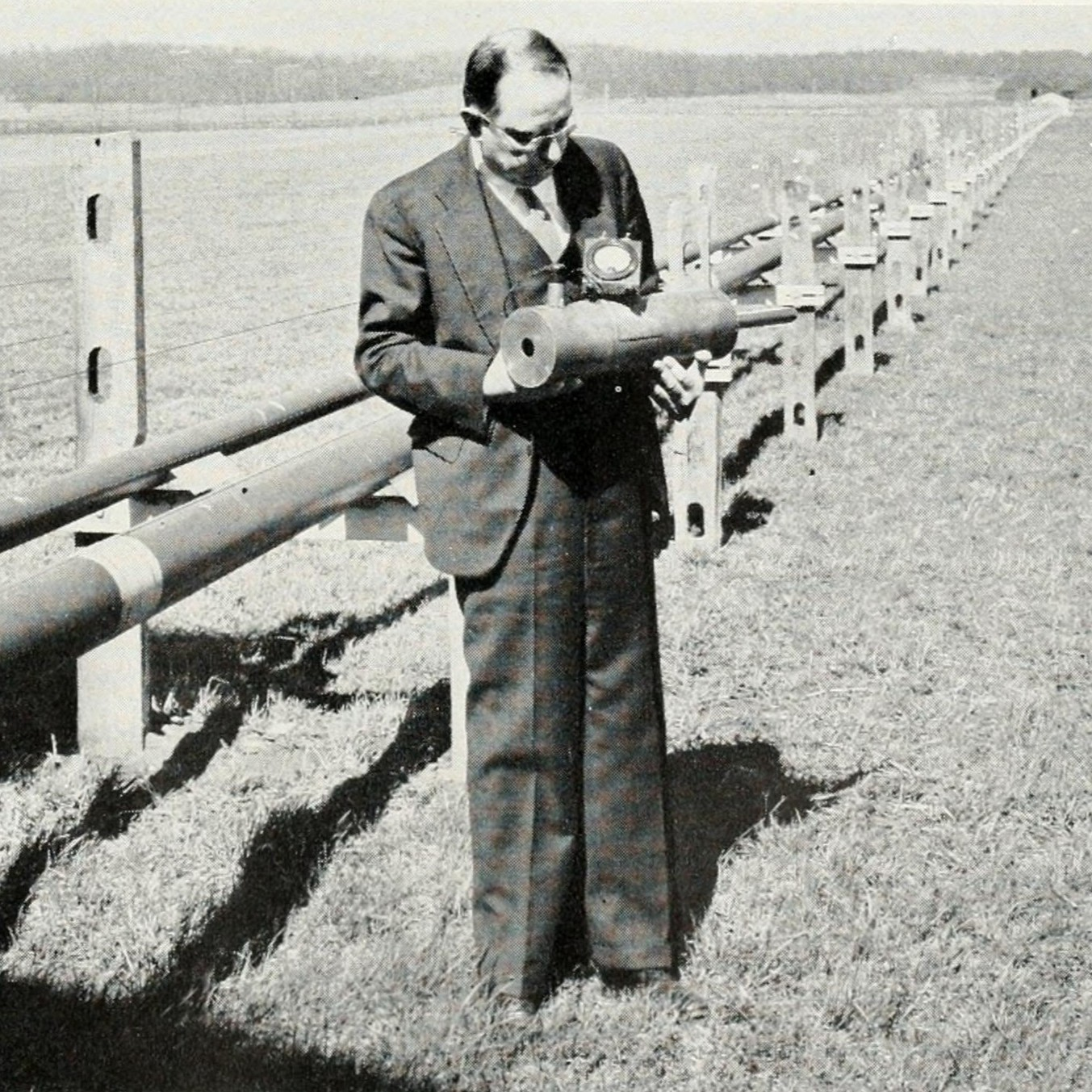
- Southworth at Bell Labs in 1939, in front of the experimental waveguide line he used during the 1930s
- Born: August 24, 1890
- Died: July 6, 1972 (aged 81)
- Awards: Stuart Ballantine Medal (1947); IEEE Medal of Honor (1963)
- Scientific career
- Fields: Electrical engineering

George Clark Southworth (August 24, 1890 – July 6, 1972), who published as G. C. Southworth, was a prominent American radio engineer best known for his role in the development of waveguides in the early 1930s.

== Biography ==
Southworth was born in Little Cooley, Pennsylvania, graduated in 1914 with a physics degree from Grove City College, and studied one year at Columbia University. In June 1917 he joined the National Bureau of Standards, then in 1918 moved to Yale University to teach in a Signal Corps school. He remained at Yale to complete a doctorate in 1923 on the measurement of the dielectric constant of water at frequencies above 15 MHz.

Southworth left Yale for a position with the American Telephone and Telegraph Company, where he first helped edit the Bell System Technical Journal, but then switched to researching shortwave radio propagation.

In 1931 he began to study wave propagation in dielectric rods, by early 1932 observed wave propagation in a water-filled copper pipe, and by May 1933 transmitted waves through air-filled copper pipes up to 20 feet in length. (He later recalled that the first message sent through a waveguide was "Send Money.") After he constructed a 5-in.-diameter waveguide with a length of 875 feet, the project was moved to the Bell Telephone Laboratories in Holmdel, New Jersey, where he spent the rest of his career until retirement in 1955.

Southworth received the Morris N. Liebmann Award in 1938, and the IEEE Medal of Honor in 1963 "For pioneering contributions to microwave radio physics, to radio astronomy, and to waveguide transmission."

== Selected works ==
- Southworth, George (1950). Principles and Applications of Waveguide Transmission. The Bell Telephone Laboratories Series. Princeton, New Jersey: Van Nostrand.
- Southworth, George C. (1962). Forty Years of Radio Research: A Reportorial Account. New York, NY: Gordon and Breach Science Publishers, Inc.
