= Piezoelectric accelerometer =

Type of accelerometer

A description of how a piezoelectric accelerometer works in theory.

A piezoelectric accelerometer is an accelerometer that employs the piezoelectric effect of certain materials to measure dynamic changes in mechanical variables (e.g., acceleration, vibration, and mechanical shock).

As with all transducers, piezoelectrics convert one form of energy into another and provide an electrical signal in response to a quantity, property, or condition that is being measured. Using the general sensing method upon which all accelerometers are based, acceleration acts upon a seismic mass that is restrained by a spring or suspended on a cantilever beam, and converts a physical force into an electrical signal. Before the acceleration can be converted into an electrical quantity it must first be converted into either a force or displacement. This conversion is done via the mass spring system shown in the figure to the right.

== Introduction ==
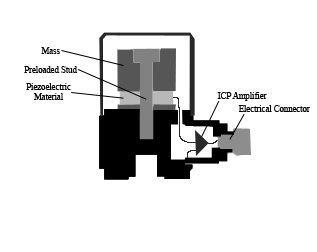
The cross-section of a piezoelectric accelerometer.

The word piezoelectric finds its roots in the Greek word piezein, which means to squeeze or press. When a physical force is exerted on the accelerometer, the seismic mass loads the piezoelectric element according to Newton's second law of motion ($F=ma$). The force exerted on the piezoelectric material can be observed in the change in the electrostatic force or voltage generated by the piezoelectric material. This differs from a piezoresistive effect in that piezoresistive materials experience a change in the resistance of the material rather than a change in charge or voltage. Physical force exerted on the piezoelectric can be classified as one of two types; bending or compression. Stress of the compression type can be understood as a force exerted to one side of the piezoelectric while the opposing side rests against a fixed surface, while bending involves a force being exerted on the piezoelectric from both sides.

Piezoelectric materials used for the purpose of accelerometers fall into two categories: single crystal and ceramic materials. The first and more widely used are single-crystal materials (usually quartz). Though these materials do offer a long life span in terms of sensitivity, their disadvantage is that they are generally less sensitive than some piezoelectric ceramics. The other category, ceramic materials, have a higher piezoelectric constant (sensitivity) than single-crystal materials, and are less expensive to produce. Ceramics use barium titanate, lead-zirconate-lead-titanate, lead metaniobate, and other materials whose composition is considered proprietary by the company responsible for their development. The disadvantage of piezoelectric ceramics, however, is that their sensitivity degrades with time making the longevity of the device less than that of single-crystal materials.

In applications when low sensitivity piezoelectrics are used, two or more crystals can be connected together for output multiplication. The proper material can be chosen for particular applications based on the sensitivity, frequency response, bulk-resistivity, and thermal response. Due to the low output signal and high output impedance that piezoelectric accelerometers possess, there is a need for amplification and impedance conversion of the signal produced. In the past this problem has been solved using a separate (external) amplifier/impedance converter. This method, however, is generally impractical due to the noise that is introduced as well as the physical and environmental constraints posed on the system as a result. Today IC amplifiers/impedance converters are commercially available and are generally packaged within the case of the accelerometer itself.

== History ==
Behind the mystery of the operation of the piezoelectric accelerometer lie some very fundamental concepts governing the behavior of crystallographic structures. In 1880, Pierre and Jacques Curie published an experimental demonstration connecting mechanical stress and surface charge on a crystal. This phenomenon became known as the piezoelectric effect. Closely related to this phenomenon is the Curie point, named for the physicist Pierre Curie, which is the temperature above which piezoelectric material loses spontaneous polarization of its atoms.

The development of the commercial piezoelectric accelerometer came about through a number of attempts to find the most effective method to measure the vibration on large structures such as bridges and on vehicles in motion such as aircraft. One attempt involved using the resistance strain gage as a device to build an accelerometer. Incidentally, it was Hans J. Meier who, through his work at MIT, is given credit as the first to construct a commercial strain gage accelerometer (circa 1938). However, the strain gage accelerometers were fragile and could only produce low resonant frequencies and they also exhibited a low frequency response. These limitations in dynamic range made it unsuitable for testing naval aircraft structures. On the other hand, the piezoelectric sensor was proven to be a much better choice over the strain gage in designing an accelerometer. The high modulus of elasticity of piezoelectric materials makes the piezoelectric sensor a more viable solution to the problems identified with the strain gage accelerometer.

Simply stated, the inherent properties of the piezoelectric accelerometers made it a much better alternative to the strain gage types because of its high frequency response, and its ability to generate high resonant frequencies. The piezoelectric accelerometer allowed for a reduction in its physical size at the manufacturing level and it also provided for a higher g (standard gravity) capability relative to the strain gage type. By comparison, the strain gage type exhibited a flat frequency response up to 200 Hz while the piezoelectric type provided a flat response up to 10,000 Hz. These improvements made it possible for measuring the high frequency vibrations associated with the quick movements and short duration shocks of aircraft which before was not possible with the strain gage types. Before long, the technological benefits of the piezoelectric accelerometer became apparent and in the late 1940s, large scale production of piezoelectric accelerometers began. Today, piezoelectric accelerometers are used for instrumentation in the fields of engineering, health and medicine, aeronautics and many other different industries.

== Manufacturing ==
There are two common methods used to manufacture accelerometers. One is based upon the principles of piezoresistance and the other is based on the principles of piezoelectricity. Both methods ensure that unwanted orthogonal acceleration vectors are excluded from detection.

Manufacturing an accelerometer that uses piezoresistance first starts with a semiconductor layer that is attached to a handle wafer by a thick oxide layer. The semiconductor layer is then patterned to the accelerometer's geometry. This semiconductor layer has one or more apertures so that the underlying mass will have the corresponding apertures. Next the semiconductor layer is used as a mask to etch out a cavity in the underlying thick oxide. A mass in the cavity is supported in cantilever fashion by the piezoresistant arms of the semiconductor layer. Directly below the accelerometer's geometry is a flex cavity that allows the mass in the cavity to flex or move in direction that is orthogonal to the surface of the accelerometer.

Accelerometers based upon piezoelectricity are constructed with two piezoelectric transducers. The unit consists of a hollow tube that is sealed by a piezoelectric transducer on each end. The transducers are oppositely polarized and are selected to have a specific series capacitance. The tube is then partially filled with a heavy liquid and the accelerometer is excited. While excited the total output voltage is continuously measured and the volume of the heavy liquid is microadjusted until the desired output voltage is obtained. Finally the outputs of the individual transducers are measured, the residual voltage difference is tabulated, and the dominant transducer is identified.

In 1943 the Danish company Brüel & Kjær launched Type 4301 - the world's first charge accelerometer.

== Applications of piezoelectric accelerometers ==
Piezoelectric accelerometers are used in many different industries, environments, and applications - all typically requiring measurement of short duration impulses. Piezoelectric measuring devices are widely used today in the laboratory, on the production floor, and as original equipment for measuring and recording dynamic changes in mechanical variables including shock and vibration.

Some accelerometers have built-in electronics to amplify the signal before transmitting it to the recording device. This work was pioneered by PCB Piezotronics, released in 1967 as ICP® Integrated circuit piezoelectric, later evolving to be the IEPE standard (see Integrated Electronics Piezo-Electric). Other related, brand specific descriptors of IEPE are: CCLD, IsoTron or DeltaTron.

Accelerometers also have had the addition of onboard memory to contain serial number and calibration data, typically referred to as TEDS Transducer Electronic Data Sheet per the IEEE 1451 standard.
