= Edward Norton (disambiguation) =

Edward Norton (born 1969) is an American actor.

Edward or Ed Norton may also refer to:

- Edward Norton (conspirator) (c. 1654–1702), English soldier and politician
- Edward Norton (diplomat) (1874–1959), American diplomat and businessman
- Edward Norton (MP) (1750–1786), English politician
- Edward Norton (judge) (1807–1872), California Supreme Court justice
- Edward F. Norton (1884–1954), British soldier and mountaineer
- Edward Lawry Norton (1898–1983), American engineer
- Edward L. Norton (1892–1966), American banker
- Ed Norton (The Honeymooners), American sidekick on TV sitcom
- Edward Norton Lorenz (1917–2008), American mathematician
