= PCB Piezotronics =

American manufacturing company making piezoelectric sensors

PCB Piezotronics, Inc.
- Founded: August 1967; 59 years ago
- Founder: Robert W. Lally and James F. Lally
- Headquarters: Depew, New York, United States
- Area served: Worldwide
- Products: Piezoelectric Sensors, Pressure Sensors, Vibration Sensors, Force Sensors, Impact Hammers, Signal Conditioners, Accelerometers
- Number of employees: 1,041 (2015)
- Parent: Amphenol Corporation
- Website: www.pcb.com

PCB Piezotronics is an American manufacturer of piezoelectric sensors headquarter in Depew, New York. PCB manufactures sensors and related instrumentation which are small electromechanical instruments for the measurement of acceleration, dynamic pressure, force, acoustics, torque, load, strain, shock, vibration and sound.

The name "PCB" is abbreviation for "PicoCoulomB" which is technical terminology defining an electrical charge of the type generated by the piezoelectric sensors they manufacture. It is also a registered trademark of the company. "Piezotronics" combines the science of Piezoelectricity and electronics.

== History ==
Founded by Robert W. Lally and James (Jim) F. Lally in 1967, PCB Piezotronics has evolved from a family business to a large company engineering and manufacturing operation, with technical emphasis on the incorporation of integrated circuit-piezoelectric sensor technology. In 1967 the integrated circuit piezoelectric sensor, also known as ICP sensors, incorporated microelectronic circuitry, were developed and marketed.

The 1970s for PCB Piezotronics saw expansion of its standard product offerings, to include other types of sensor technologies. In 1971, the company developed a 100,000 g high-shock, ICP® quartz accelerometer; Impulse Hammers for structural excitation were developed in 1972; and in 1973, the first rugged, industrial-grade ICP® accelerometer was introduced to serve the emerging machinery health monitoring market. Employment grew to 25 employees. By 1975, PCB® had become one of the largest U.S. manufacturers of piezoelectric sensors.

During the 1980s, PCB® continued to develop new products. In 1982, the Structural* Modal Array Sensing System was developed to ease sensor installation and reduce set-up time on larger-scale modal surveys. Modally-Tuned* Impulse Hammers won the IR-100 Award as one of the top 100 technical developments for 1983. The 128-channel Data Harvester was invented in 1984 to provide sensor power and speed modal analysis by offering automatic bank switching capability. In 1986, PCB developed the first commercial quartz shear-structured ICP® accelerometer. Additionally in 1980, PCB® broke ground on 6 acres (24,000 m^{2}) of land at 3425 Walden Avenue for its new quartz technology center, a location which it continues to occupy today. The facility doubled in size in 1985, and in 1996 an additional was added. An acre of land to the west of the building was purchased for future expansion and in 1999 a 30,000-square-foot (2,800 m^{2}) addition was completed.

In 1995, Underwriters Laboratory certified PCB to the International Quality Standard ISO-9001. In January 2002, The American Association for Laboratory Accreditation (A2LA) recognized PCB with accreditation to ISO 17025, an international standard for assuring technical competence in calibration and testing.

In 2015, Jim Lally was presented the lifetime achievement award at the 86th annual Shock and Vibration Symposium in Orlando. "This award recognized Jim Lally's 60 years of dedication to providing dynamic sensor technology in blast, ballistics, shock, vibration, acoustics, strain, and dynamic force to the SAVE community. It also recognizes both his generous contributions to educational institutions and his professionalism in corporate interactions."

PCB Group, Inc. was acquired by MTS Systems Corporation in July 2016 but retained its president David Hore and all its employees and facilities.

== Divisions ==
The company is organized into various divisions and product groups, and has representation in more than 60 countries worldwide. These divisions include PCB Automotive Sensors, based in Farmington Hills, Michigan; PCB Aerospace & Defense; IMI Sensors; and Larson Davis, based in Depew, NY. PCB product groups include Shock and Vibration; Microphones; Force; Pressure; and Electronics.
