= Laser accelerometer =

Type of accelerometer

A laser accelerometer is an accelerometer that uses a laser to measure changes in velocity/direction.

== Mechanism ==
It employs a frame with three orthogonal input axes and multiple proof masses. Each proof mass has a predetermined blanking surface. A flexible beam supports each proof mass. The flexible beam permits movement of the proof mass on its axis.

A laser light source provides a light ray. The laser source has a transverse field characteristic with a central null intensity region. A mirror transmits a beam of light to a detector. The detector is positioned to be centered on the light ray and responds to the light's intensity to provide an intensity signal. The signal's magnitude is related to the intensity of the light ray.

The proof mass blanking surface is centrally positioned within and normal to the light ray null intensity region to provide increased blanking of the light ray in response to transverse movement of the mass on the input axis.

In response to acceleration in the direction of the input axis, the proof mass deflects the beam and moves the blanking surface in a direction transverse to the light ray to partially blank the light beam. A control responds to the intensity signal to apply a restoring force to restore the proof mass to a central position and provides an output signal proportional to the restoring force.

== Applications ==
Accelerometers are added to many devices, including (smart) watches, phones and vehicles of all kinds. Accelerometers oriented vertically function as gravimeters, useful for mining. Other applications include medical diagnostics and satellite measurements for climate change studies.

== Lasers ==
Basic lasers operate with a frequency range (line width) of some 500 mHz. The range is widened by small temperature changes and vibrations, and by imperfections in the laser cavity. The line width of a specialised scientific laser approaches 1mHz.

== History ==
=== 2021 ===
An accelerometer was announced that used infrared light to measure the change in distance between two micromirrors in a Fabry–Perot cavity. The proof mass is a single silicon crystal with a mass of 10–20 mg, suspended from the first mirror using flexible 1.5 μm-thick silicon nitride (Si_{3}N_{4}) beams. The suspension allows the proof mass to move freely, with nearly ideal translational motion. The second (concave) mirror acts as the fixed reference point. Light of a certain frequency resonates – bounces back and forth – between the two mirrors in the cavity, increasing its intensity, while other frequencies are discarded. Under acceleration, the proof mass displacement relative to the concave mirror changes the intensity of reflected light. The change in intensity is measured by a single-frequency laser that matches the cavity's resonant frequency.The device can sense displacements under 1 femtometre (10^{−15} m) and detect accelerations as low as 3.2 × 10-8 g (the acceleration due to Earth's gravity) with uncertainty under 1%.

An accelerometer was announced with a line width of 20 Hz. The SolsTiS accelerometer has a titanium-doped sapphire cavity that is shaped in a way to encourage a narrow line width and to rapidly dissipate waste heat. The device exploits the wave qualities of atoms. The laser is divided into multiple beams. One beam strikes a diffuse rubidium gas refrigerated to around 10^{−7} K. This temperature is achieved by using Doppler cooling with six beams to slow/cool the atoms. The atoms split into two quantum waves. A second pulse reverses the split, while a third allows them to interfere with each other, creating an interference pattern that reflects acceleration the waves underwent while separated. Another laser pulse detects the interference patterns in the various atoms, which reflects the amount of acceleration. Military-grade laser accelerometers, drift (accumulate errors at the rate of) kilometres a day. The new devices reduce drift to 2 km a month.

== See also ==
- List of laser articles
