= Léon Charles Thévenin =

French telegraph engineer (1857–1926)

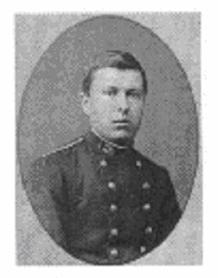
- Léon Charles Thévenin
- Born: March 30, 1857; Meaux, France
- Died: September 21, 1926 (aged 69); Paris, France
- Education: École polytechnique
- Engineering career
- Discipline: Telegraph
- Significant advance: Thévenin's theorem

Léon Charles Thévenin (French: [tev(ə)nɛ̃]; 30 March 1857, Meaux, Seine-et-Marne – 21 September 1926, Paris) was a French telegraph engineer who extended Ohm's law to the analysis of complex electrical circuits.

== Biography ==
Born in Meaux, France, Thévenin entered the École polytechnique in Paris in 1876. Upon graduation, in 1878, he joined the Corps of telegraph Engineers (which subsequently became the French PTT). There, he initially worked on the development of long distance underground telegraph lines.

Appointed as a teaching inspector at the École supérieure de télégraphie in 1882, he became increasingly interested in the problems of measurement in electrical circuits. As a result of studying Kirchhoff's circuit laws and Ohm's law, he developed his famous theorem, Thévenin's theorem, which made it possible to calculate currents in more complex electrical circuits and allowing people to reduce complex circuits into simpler circuits called Thévenin's equivalent circuits.

Also, after becoming head of the Bureau des Lignes, he found time for teaching other subjects outside the École Supérieure, including a course in mechanics at the Institut National Agronomique, Paris. In 1896, he was appointed Director of the Telegraph Engineering School, and then in 1901, Engineer in chief of the telegraph workshops.

He was a talented violinist. Another favorite pastime of his was angling. He remained single but shared his home with a widowed cousin of his mother and her two children whom he later adopted. Thévenin consulted several scholars well known at that time, and controversy arose as to whether his law was consistent with the facts or not. He died in Paris. Shortly before his death he was visited by a friend, J. B. Pomey, and was surprised to hear that his theorem had been accepted all over the world. In 1926, he was taken to Paris for treatment. He left a formal request that no one should accompany him to the cemetery except his family and that nothing be placed on his coffin but a rose from his garden. This is how he was buried at Meaux. Thévenin is remembered as a model engineer and employee, hard-working, of scrupulous morality, strict in his principles but kind at heart.

== See also ==
- Hermann von Helmholtz
- Edward Lawry Norton
