= Source transformation =

Process of simplifying circuit solutions

Source transformation is the process of simplifying a circuit solution, especially with mixed sources, by transforming voltage sources into current sources, and vice versa, using Thévenin's theorem and Norton's theorem respectively.

== Process ==
Performing a source transformation consists of using Ohm's law to take an existing voltage source in series with a resistance, and replacing it with a current source in parallel with the same resistance, or vice versa. The transformed sources are considered identical and can be substituted for one another in a circuit.

Source transformations are not limited to resistive circuits. They can be performed on a circuit involving capacitors and inductors as well, by expressing circuit elements as impedances and sources in the frequency domain. In general, the concept of source transformation is an application of Thévenin's theorem to a current source, or Norton's theorem to a voltage source. However, this means that source transformation is bound by the same conditions as Thevenin's theorem and Norton's theorem; namely that the load behaves linearly, and does not contain dependent voltage or current sources.

Source transformations are used to exploit the equivalence of a real current source and a real voltage source, such as a battery. Application of Thévenin's theorem and Norton's theorem gives the quantities associated with the equivalence. Specifically, given a real current source, which is an ideal current source $I$ in parallel with an impedance $Z$, applying a source transformation gives an equivalent real voltage source, which is an ideal voltage source in series with the impedance. The impedance $Z$ retains its value and the new voltage source $V$ has value equal to the ideal current source's value times the impedance, according to Ohm's law $V=I \, Z$. In the same way, an ideal voltage source in series with an impedance can be transformed into an ideal current source in parallel with the same impedance, where the new ideal current source has value $I = V/Z$.

== Example calculation ==
Source transformations are easy to compute using Ohm's law. If there is a voltage source in series with an impedance, it is possible to find the value of the equivalent current source in parallel with the impedance by dividing the value of the voltage source by the value of the impedance. The converse also holds: if a current source in parallel with an impedance is present, multiplying the value of the current source with the value of the impedance provides the equivalent voltage source in series with the impedance. A visual example of a source transformation can be seen in Figure 1.

$$V = I\cdot Z,  \qquad  I = \cfrac VZ$$

Figure 1. An example of a DC source transformation. Notice that the impedance Z is the same in both configurations.

== A brief proof of the theorem ==
The transformation can be derived from the uniqueness theorem. In the present context, it implies that a black box with two terminals must have a unique well-defined relation between its voltage and current. It is readily to verify that the above transformation indeed gives the same V-I curve, and therefore the transformation is valid.

== See also ==
- Ohm's law
- Thévenin's theorem
- Current source
- Voltage source
- Electrical impedance
