= Three-Axis Acceleration Switch =

The three-axis acceleration switch is a micromachined microelectromechanical systems (MEMS) sensor that detects whether an acceleration event has exceeded a predefined threshold. It is a small, compact device, only 5mm by 5mm, and measures acceleration in the x, y, and z axes. It was developed by the Army Research Laboratory for the purposes of traumatic brain injury (TBI) research and was first introduced in 2012 at the 25th International Conference on Micro Electro Mechanical Systems (MEMS).

The three-axis acceleration switch was designed to obtain acceleration data more effectively than a conventional accelerometer in order to more accurately characterize the forces and shocks responsible for TBI. While miniature accelerometers require a constant power draw, the three-axis acceleration switch only draws current when it senses an acceleration event, using up less energy and allowing the use of smaller batteries. The three-axis acceleration switch has shown to exhibit an expected battery lifetime that is about 100 times better than that of a digital accelerometer. In return, however, the acceleration switch has a lower resolution than that of a digital or analog accelerometer.

One potential application of the three-axis acceleration switch is in studying the head impacts of players in high-risk contact sports. Due to the size of conventional accelerometers, measuring the acceleration requires the device to be implemented inside the player's helmet, which is designed to mitigate the collision forces and thus may not accurately reflect the true level of injury potential. In contrast, the miniature nature of the acceleration switch makes it easier for the switch to be affixed directly onto the participant's head.
