= Integrated Electronics Piezo-Electric =

Technical standard for piezoelectric sensors

Integrated Electronics Piezo-Electric (IEPE) characterises a technical standard for piezoelectric sensors which contain built-in impedance conversion electronics. IEPE sensors are used to measure acceleration, force or pressure. Measurement microphones also apply the IEPE standard. Other proprietary names for the same principle are Integrated Circuit Piezo-electric (ICP), Constant Current Line Drive (CCLD), IsoTron or DeltaTron.

The electronics of the IEPE sensor (typically implemented as FET circuit) converts the high impedance signal of the piezoelectric material into a voltage signal with a low impedance of typically 100 Ω. A low impedance signal is advantageous because it can be transmitted across long cable lengths without a loss of signal quality. In addition, special low noise cables, which are otherwise required for use with piezoelectric sensors, are no longer necessary.

The sensor circuit is supplied with constant current. A distinguishing feature of the IEPE principle is that the power supply and the sensor signal are transmitted via one shielded wire.

Most IEPE sensors work at a constant current between 2 and 20 mA. A common value is 4 mA. The higher the constant current the longer the possible cable length. Cables of several hundred meters length can be used without a loss of signal quality. Supplying the IEPE sensor with constant current, results in a positive bias voltage, typically between 8 and 12 volts, at the output. The actual measuring signal of the sensor is added to this bias voltage. The supply or compliance voltage of the constant current source should be 24 to 30 V which is about two times the bias voltage. This ensures maximum amplitudes in positive and negative direction.

A typical IEPE sensor supply with 4 mA constant current and 25 V compliance voltage has a power consumption of 100 mW. This can be a drawback in battery powered systems. For such applications low-power IEPE sensors exist which can be operated at only 0.1 mA constant current from a 12 V supply. This may save up to 90 % power.

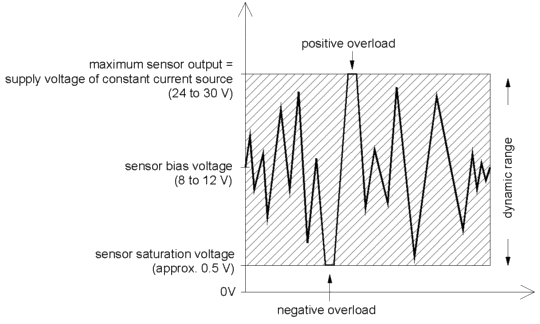
Bias voltage and output voltage swing of an IEPE sensor

Many measuring instruments designed for piezoelectric sensors or measurement microphones have an IEPE constant current source integrated at the input. In measuring instruments with IEPE input the bias voltage is often used for sensor detection. If the signal lies close to the constant current supply voltage, there is no sensor present or the cable path has been interrupted. A signal close to the saturation voltage, indicates a short circuit in the sensor or cable. In between these two limits a functional sensor has been detected. The bias voltage is cut off by a coupling capacitor at the instrument input and only the AC signal is processed further.

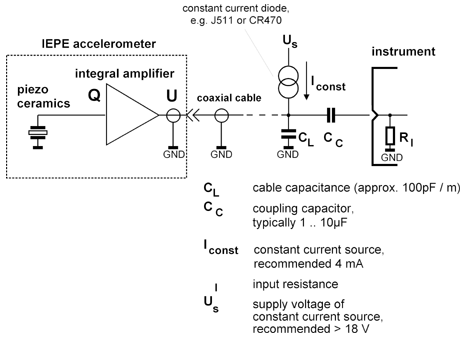
IEPE sensor connected to the input of an instrument

Piezoelectric sensors which do not possess IEPE electronics, meaning with charge output, remain reserved for applications where lowest frequencies, high operating temperatures, an extremely large dynamic range, very energy saving operation or extremely small design is required.

== See also ==
- Piezoelectric sensor
- Piezoelectricity
- Accelerometer
- Microphone
- Electrical impedance
- Constant current
- Charge amplifier
