= Gallium phosphate =

Names
- Other names Gallium monophosphate Phosphoric acid, gallium salt (1:1); Gallium orthophosphate

Identifiers
| CAS Number | 14014-97-2 |
| 3D model (JSmol) | Interactive image; Interactive image |
| ChemSpider | 7991051 |
| PubChem CID | 9815301 |
| CompTox Dashboard (EPA) | DTXSID101045828 |
- InChI: InChI=1S/Ga.H3O4P/c;1-5(2,3)4/h;(H3,1,2,3,4)/q+3;/p-3 Key: LWFNJDOYCSNXDO-UHFFFAOYSA-K
- SMILES: O=P12O[Ga](O1)O2; [Ga+3].[O-]P([O-])([O-])=O

Properties
| Chemical formula | GaPO_{4} |
| Molar mass | 164.694 g/mol |
| Appearance | Transparent crystals |
| Solubility in water | Insoluble |
| Refractive index (n_{D}) | n_{o}=1.605, n_{e}=1.623 |
- Except where otherwise noted, data are given for materials in their standard state (at 25 °C [77 °F], 100 kPa). Infobox references

GaPO_{4}

General
| Category | crystal |
| Chemical formula (or Composition) | GaPO_{4} |

Identification
| Color | Clear |
| Crystal system | Trigonal |
| Crystal class | 32 or D_{3} (Schönflies) |
| Cleavage | None |
| Fracture | Conchoidal |
| Mohs Scale hardness | 5.5 |
| Refractive index | n_{o}=1.605, n_{e}=1.623 |
| Pleochroism | None |
| Streak | White |
| Density | 3570 kg/m^{3} |
| Solubility | insoluble in pH = 5 - 8 |
- other properties
| Pyroelectricity | None |
| Particular characteristics | quartz isotype, piezoelectric effect up to 950°C (1742°F) |

Gallium phosphate (GaPO_{4} or gallium orthophosphate) is a colorless trigonal crystal with a hardness of 5.5 on the Mohs scale. GaPO_{4} is isotypic with quartz, possessing very similar properties, but the silicon atoms are alternately substituted with gallium and phosphorus, thereby doubling the piezoelectric effect. GaPO_{4} has many advantages over quartz for technical applications, like a higher electromechanical coupling coefficient in resonators, due to this doubling. Contrary to quartz, GaPO_{4} is not found in nature. Therefore, a hydrothermal process must be used to synthesize the crystal.

== Modifications ==
GaPO_{4} possesses, in contrast to quartz, no α-β phase transition, thus the low temperature structure (structure like α-quartz) of GaPO_{4} is stable up to 970°C, as are most of its other physical properties. Around 970°C another phase transition occurs which changes the low quartz structure into another structure similar with cristobalite.

== Structure ==
The specific structure of GaPO_{4} shows the arrangement of tetrahedrons consisting of GaO_{4} and PO_{4} that are slightly tilted. Because of the helical arrangement of these tetrahedrons, two modifications of GaPO_{4} exist with different optical rotation (left and right).

== Sources ==
GaPO_{4} does not occur in nature; thus it must be grown synthetically. Presently, only one company in Austria produces these crystals commercially.

== History and technical importance ==
Pressure sensors based on quartz have to be cooled with water for applications at higher temperatures (above 300°C). Starting in 1994 it was possible to substitute these big sensors with miniaturized, non cooled ones, based on GaPO_{4}. Further exceptional properties of GaPO_{4} for applications at high temperatures include its nearly temperature independent piezo effect and excellent electrical insulation up to 900°C. For bulk resonator applications, this crystal exhibits temperature compensated cuts of up to 500°C while having Q factors comparable with quartz. Due to these material properties, GaPO_{4} is very suitable for piezoelectric pressure sensors at high temperatures and for high temperature microbalance.

== Literature ==
- Gautschi, Gustav (2013-06-29). Piezoelectric Sensorics: Force Strain Pressure Acceleration and Acoustic Emission Sensors Materials and Amplifiers. Springer. ISBN 978-3-662-04732-3.
