= Kionix =

American MEMS inertial sensor manufacturer

Kionix, Inc. was a manufacturer of MEMS inertial sensors. Formerly headquartered in Ithaca, New York, United States, the company is a wholly owned subsidiary of ROHM Co., Ltd. of Japan. Kionix developed high-aspect-ratio silicon micromachining based on research originally conducted at Cornell University. The company offered inertial sensors, development tools and application support to enable motion-based gaming; user-interface functionality in mobile handsets, personal navigation and TV remote controllers; and hard-disk-drive drop protection in mobile products. The company's MEMS products are also used in the automotive, industrial and health-care sectors. Kionix is ISO 9001:2008 and TS16949 registered.

== History ==
Founded in 1993, Kionix supplied silicon microelectromechanical systems (MEMS) accelerometer products. Kionix introduced a tri-axis accelerometer in a small form-factor package.

In November, 2009, ROHM Co., Ltd. of Japan acquired Kionix.

As of April 1, 2026, ROHM has exited the MEMS accelerometer market and as a result no Kionix-branded chips remain in production. The former headquarters of Kionix in Ithaca, NY is now owned and operated by Menlo Micro of Irvine, California, United States.

== Products ==
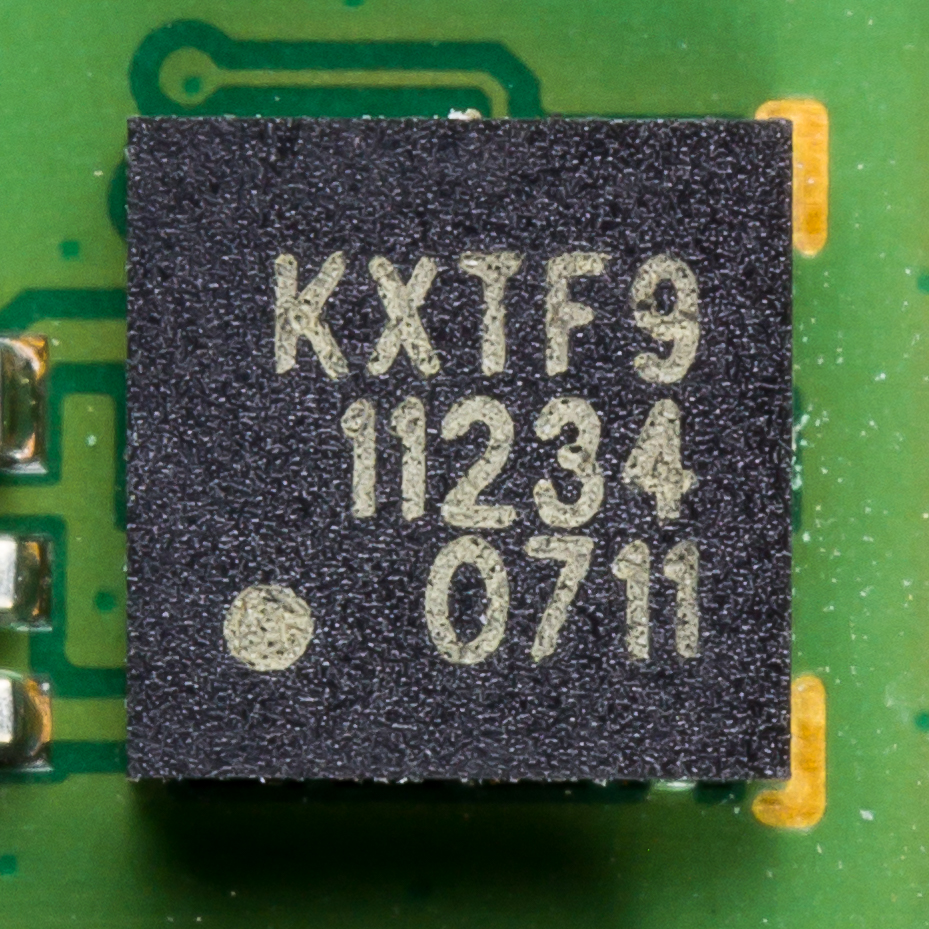
Kionix KXTF9: Tri-axis Digital Accelerometer. Size: 3x3x0.9mm

Kionix supplied MEMS devices including tri-axis accelerometers and gyroscopes along with the mixed-signal-interface integrated circuits that provide algorithm processing of sensor data. Its products and technologies included:

- Accelerometers with one, two, or three axes; low-g or mid-g ranges
- Angular rate sensors about the x, y, or z axis
- Power management options and self-test features
- Small form-factor, industry-standard packaging
- Digital (I2C and SPI) interfaces and/or analog outputs
- Programmable motion interrupts, temperature compensation, gain, offset, bandwidth
- Embedded algorithms
- Lead-free solderability and RoHS compliant

== Quality standards ==
Kionix achieved ISO registration in FY2000 and upgraded to ISO 9001:2000 in May 2003, and certified to ISO9001:2008 in April 2009.

The company achieved ISO/TS 16949 registration in July 2005 and upgraded to ISO/TS16949:2009 in April, 2011.

== Manufacturing facilities ==
Kionix sensors were designed, manufactured, and tested at Kionix headquarters in Ithaca, NY. The ASICs used in Kionix accelerometers were designed in Ithaca and fabricated elsewhere in the US. Wafers of sensor die and ASIC die were shipped from Ithaca to packaging houses in Asia, where the final product is created. At the packaging houses, the wafers of sensor die and ASIC die were diced into individual units, fastened one each to a lead frame, and wire-bonded together. Liquefied plastic was then squeezed into the frame and, once set, each part was cut from its construction housing. Lastly, the company logo and part number were silk-screened onto each part. Finished parts were returned to Ithaca for testing and programming.

== Locations ==
Sales offices:

- Ithaca, New York
- Chicago, Illinois
- Campbell, California
- Kowloon, Hong Kong
- Shanghai, China
- Tokyo, Japan
- Seoul, South Korea
- Singapore
- Taipei City, Taiwan

Distributors:

- Mouser Electronics, United States
- Actrontek International Co., Ltd, China & Hong Kong
- STAV, Korea
- Seraphim Engineering Co., Ltd., Taiwan
- Willow Technologies Limited, United Kingdom/Europe

== Philanthropy ==
Kionix provided financial support and gifts in kind to educational and access-to-education programs in Ithaca and the surrounding communities. Recipients included:

- IPEI Code Red Robotics
- The Museum of the Earth
- The Sciencenter
- American Red Cross
