= Equivalent circuit model for Li-ion cells =

Model to simulate Li-ion cells electrical dynamics

The equivalent circuit model (ECM) is a common lumped-element model for Lithium-ion battery cells. The ECM simulates the terminal voltage dynamics of a Li-ion cell through an equivalent electrical network composed of passive elements, such as resistors and capacitors, and a voltage generator. The ECM is semi-mechanical and semi-empirical model. It is widely employed in several application fields, including computerized simulation, because of its simplicity, reliability, its low computational demand, its ease of characterization and implementation, and its structural flexibility. These features make the ECM suitable for real-time Battery Management System (BMS) tasks like State of Charge (SoC) estimation, State of Health (SoH) monitoring and battery thermal management.

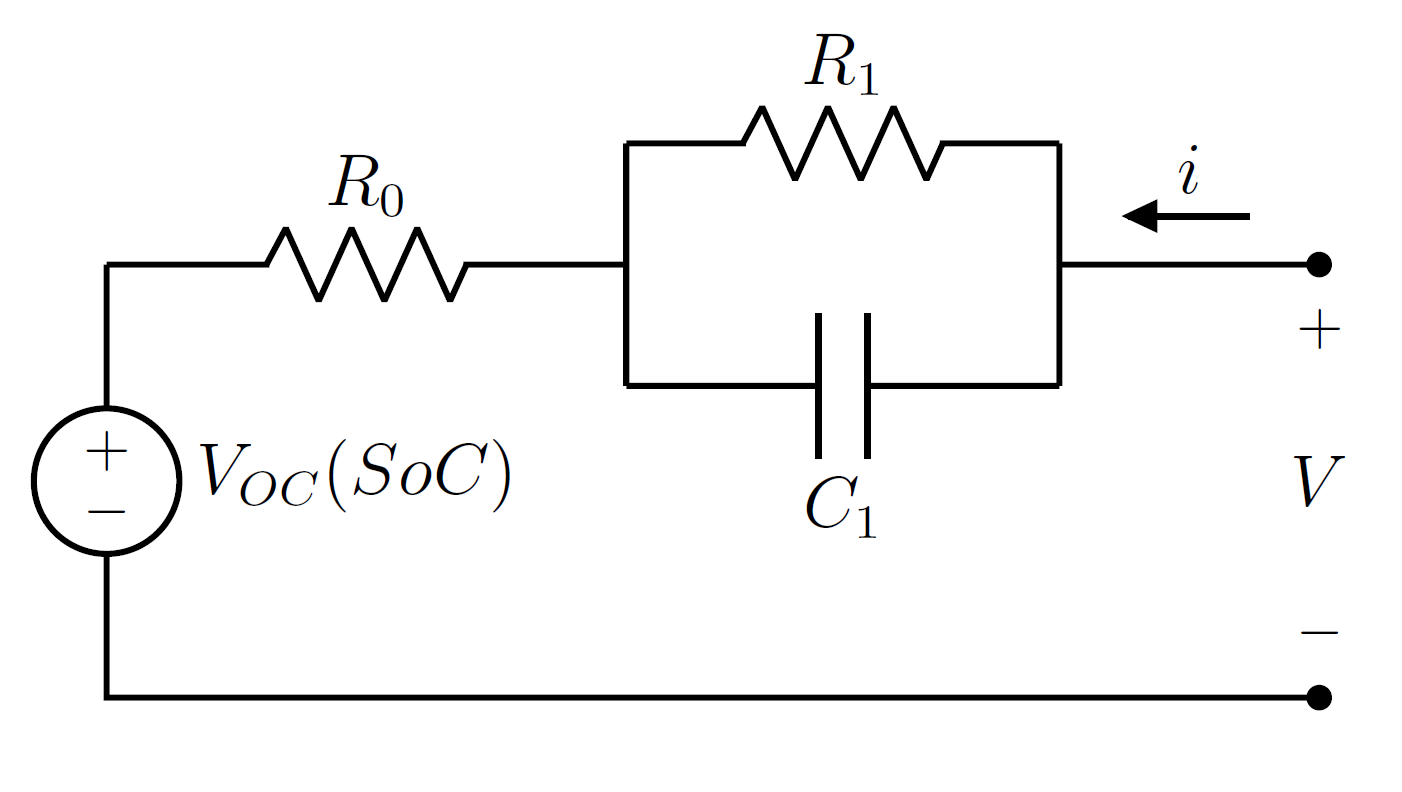
First-order equivalent circuit model for Li-ion cell

== Model structure ==
The equivalent-circuit model is used to simulate the voltage at the cell terminals when an electric current is applied to discharge or recharge it. The most common circuital representation consists of three elements in series: a variable voltage source, representing the open-circuit voltage (OCV) of the cell, a resistor representing ohmic internal resistance of the cell and a set of resistor-capacitor (RC) parallels accounting for the dynamic voltage drops.

=== Open-circuit voltage ===
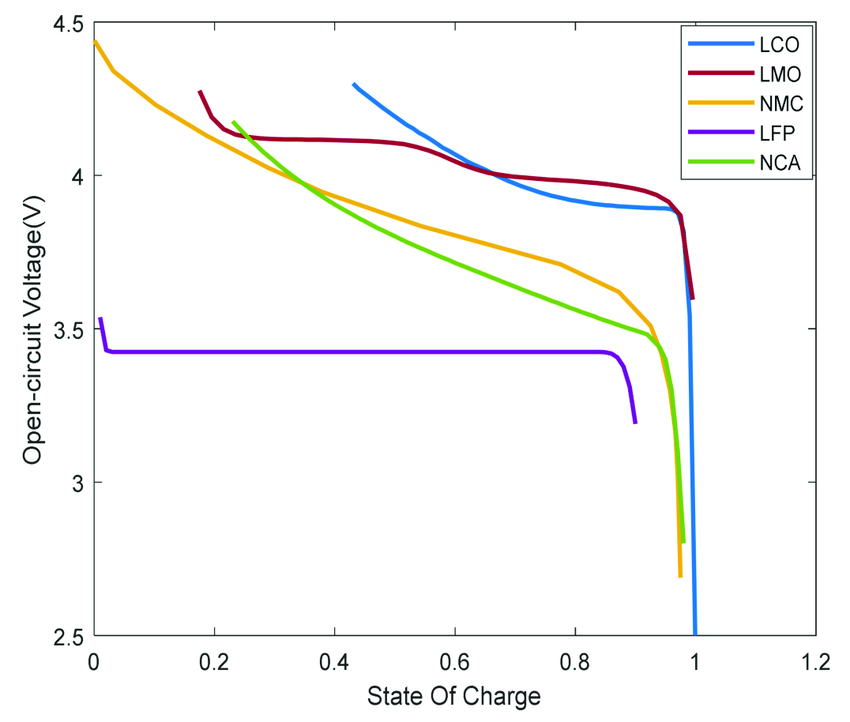
Open-circuit voltage of different cathode materials commonly used for Li-ion cells

The open-circuit voltage of a Li-ion cell (or battery) is its terminal voltage in equilibrium conditions, i.e. measured when no load current is applied and after a long rest period. The open-circuit voltage is a decreasing nonlinear function of the state of charge, and its shape depends on the chemical composition of the anode (usually made of graphite) and cathode (LFP, NMC, NCA, LCO...) of the cell. The open-circuit voltage, represented in the circuit by a state of charge-driven voltage generator, is the major voltage contribution and is the most informative indicator of cell's state of charge.

=== Internal resistance ===
The internal resistance, represented in the circuit by a simple resistor, is used to simulate the instantaneous voltage drops due to ohmic effects such as electrodes resistivity, electrolyte conductivity and contact resistance (e.g. solid-electrolyte interface (SEI) and collectors contact resistance).

Internal resistance is strongly influenced by several factors, such as:

- Temperature. The internal resistance increases significantly at low temperatures. This effect makes lithium-ion batteries particularly inefficient at low temperatures.
- State of charge. The internal resistance shows a remarkable dependence on the state of charge of the cell. In particular, at low state of charge (near-discharged cell) and high state of charge (fully charged cell), an increase in internal resistance is experienced.
- Cell aging. The internal resistance increases as the Li-ion cell ages. The main cause of the resistance increase is the thickening of the solid-electrolyte interface (SEI), a solid barrier with protective functions that grows naturally on the anode surface, composed of electrolyte decomposition-derived compounds.

=== RC parallels ===
One or more RC parallels are often added to the model to improve its accuracy in simulating dynamic voltage transients. The number of RC parallels is an arbitrary modeling choice: in general, a large number of RC parallels improves the accuracy of the model but complicates the identification process and increases the computational load, while a small number will result in a computationally light and easy-to-characterize model but less accurate in predicting cell voltage during transients. Commonly, one or two RC parallels are considered the optimal choices.

== Various models ==
=== Rint model ===
Rint model is the earliest proposed equivalent circuit model for Li-ion cells for the SoC estimation and the SoH monitoring of Li-ion cells. This model uses only one resistance that represents the internal Ohmic effect. The model is simple, however it can not represent the polarization impact of Lithium-ion cells. Thus, it has large error and it is less used in engineering applications.

=== Thevenin model ===
Thevenin model adds a resistance-capacitance circuit to the series of Rint Model so that it can characterise the polarisation effect of the Lithium-Ion battery.

== Model equations ==
The ECM can be described by a state-space representation that has current ($i$) as input and voltage at the cell terminals ($V$) as output. Consider a generic ECM model with a number of RC parallels $N$. The states of the model, (i.e., the variables that evolve over time via differential equations), are the state of charge ($SoC$) and the voltage drops across the RC parallels ($V_{c,1}, V_{c,2} \dots V_{c,N}$).

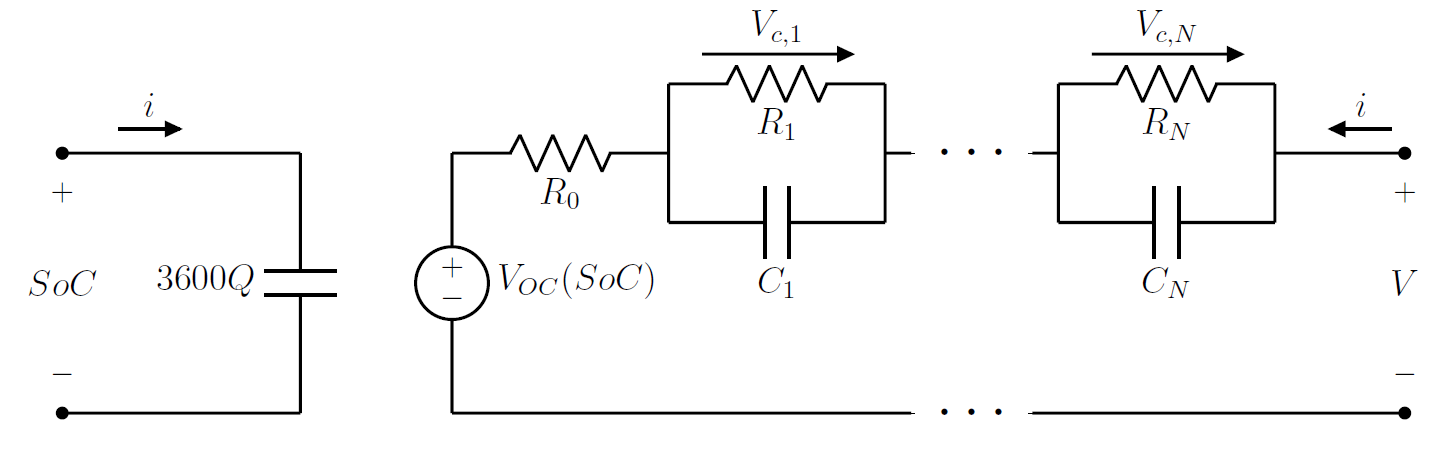
Generic-order equivalent circuit model for Li-ion cell. On the left: circuital representation of state of charge computation through Coulomb Counting integration formula. On the right: cell voltage simulation.

The state of charge is usually computed integrating the current drained/supplied by/to the battery through the formula known as Coulomb Counting:

$SoC(t)= SoC(t_0) + \int_{t_0}^t\dfrac{1}{3600Q}i(t) dt$

where $Q$ is the cell nominal capacity (expressed in ampere-hours). The voltage $V_{c,i}$ across each RC parallel is simulated as:

$\dfrac{dV_{c,i}}{dt}(t)=-\dfrac{1}{R_iC_i}V_{c,i}(t) + \dfrac{1}{C_i}i(t)$

where $R_i$ and $C_i$ are, respectively, the polarization resistance and capacity. Finally, knowing the open-circuit voltage-state of charge relationship $V_{OC}(SoC)$ and the internal resistance $R_0$, the cell terminal voltage can be computed as:

$V(t) = V_{OC}(SoC(t)) + R_0i(t) + \sum_{i=1}^NV_{c,i}(t)$

== Introduction to experimental identification ==
Experimental identification of the ECM involves the estimation of unknown parameters, especially the capacitance $Q$, the open-circuit voltage curve $V_{OC}(SoC)$, and the passive components $R_0$ and $R_i$,$C_i$. Commonly, identification is addressed in sequential steps.

=== Capacity assessment ===
Cell capacity $Q$ is usually measured by fully discharging the cell at constant current. The capacity test is commonly carried out by discharging the cell completely (from upper voltage limit $V_{max}$ to lower voltage limit $V_{min}$) at the rated current of 0.5C/1C (that is, the current required, according to the manufacturer, to fully discharge it in two/one hours) and after a full charge (usually conducted via CC-CV charging strategy). Capacity can be computed as: $Q= \int_{t\mid_{V(t)=V_{max}}}^{t\mid_{{V(t)=V_{min}}}}\dfrac{1}{3600}i(t) dt$.

=== Open-circuit voltage characterization ===
There are two main experimental techniques for characterizing the open-circuit voltage:

1. Pulse test: the cell is fully discharged/charged with a train of current pulses. Each pulse discharges a predetermined portion of the cell capacity, and thus allows a new $SoC$ point to be explored. After each current pulse, the cell is left to rest for several hours and then the open-circuit voltage $V_{OC}$ is measured. Finally, the curve $V_{OC}=f(SoC)$ is obtained by fitting the collected [$SoC$, $V_{OC}$] points by an arbitrarily chosen function (typically polynomial). This method is believed to be quick and effective, but the quality of the result depends on the experiment design and the time invested in it.
2. Slow galvanostatic discharge: another method to evaluate the open-circuit voltage of the cell is to slowly discharge/charge it under galvanostatic conditions (i.e., at low constant currents). In fact, for small currents, the approximation $V = V_{OC}(SoC) + R_0i + \sum_{i=1}^NV_{c,i} \; \underset{i \rightarrow0}{\simeq}\; V_{OC}(SoC)$ applies. Also in this case, since the accuracy of the estimate depends on how small the discharge current is, the quality of the result is closely related to the time invested in the test.

Experimental result of a pulse discharge test performed on a 3.2Ah LFP cell. From the top to the bottom: pulsed current profile; resulting voltage response; detail of the voltage response with some features (open-circuit voltage points, ohmic drops and RC transients).

=== Dynamic response characterization ===
The parameters that characterize the dynamic response, namely the ohmic resistance $R_0$ and the parameters of RC parallels $R_i$,$C_i$, are usually identified experimentally in two different ways:

1. Time domain identification: the parameters are optimized by analyzing the behavior over time of the cell voltage in response to a determined current profile. For example, a pulse test can be used for this purpose: $R_0$ can be identified (at different state of charge levels) by measuring the instantaneous voltage drops upon application/removal of each pulse, while $R_i$ and $C_i$ can be identified, by means of a dedicated optimization procedure, to best simulate the dynamic response during cell relaxation.
2. Frequency domain identification: dynamic parameters can be optimized by analyzing the frequency response of the cell. For this purpose, an AC current (or voltage) signal of varying frequency is injected into the cell, and the resulting voltage (or current) response is evaluated in terms of amplitude and phase. This analysis, called Electrochemical Impedance Spectroscopy (EIS) requires dedicated laboratory instrumentation and produces highly reliable results. EIS results, typically evaluated using the Nyquist diagram, allows the different impedance terms of the cell ($R_0$, $R_i$ and $C_i$) to be quantified separately.

== Applications ==
Some of the possible uses of ECM include:

- Online state estimation in Battery Management Systems: ECM is widely used within model-based observers designed to predict non-measurable internal states of the battery, such as state of charge and State of Health. For example, ECMs of different order are frequently used within Extended Kalman Filters developed for online state of charge estimation.
- Simulation and system design: ECM is often used in the design phase of a battery pack. Simulating electrical load profiles at the cell level allows the sizing of the system in terms of capacity and voltage. In addition, ECM can be used to simulate the battery heat generation, and thus design and size the battery cooling system, these can be done by use of various electrical simulation platforms.

Recent battery management research increasingly combines equivalent circuit models with machine-learning methods to improve state-of-health (SOH) estimation and remaining useful life (RUL) prediction. In these hybrid approaches, ECM-derived parameters such as internal resistance, polarization resistance, and capacitance serve as informative features for data-driven algorithms, combining the computational efficiency of physics-based models with the adaptability of machine learning. Such methods are particularly suitable for real-time embedded battery management systems because ECMs have relatively low computational requirements.

== See also ==
- Battery management system
- Equivalent circuit
- Internal resistance
- Lithium-ion battery
- State of charge, State of health
