= Flow-equivalent server method =

Mathematical process

In queueing theory, a discipline within the mathematical theory of probability, the flow-equivalent server method (also known as flow-equivalent aggregation technique, Norton's theorem for queueing networks or the Chandy–Herzog–Woo method) is a divide-and-conquer method to solve product form queueing networks inspired by Norton's theorem for electrical circuits. The network is successively split into two, one portion is reconfigured to a closed network and evaluated.

Marie's algorithm is a similar method where analysis of the sub-network are performed with state-dependent Poisson process arrivals.
