= Ernest G. Draper =

American central banker (1885–1954)

Member of the Federal Reserve Board of Governors
- In office March 30, 1938 – September 1, 1950
- President: Franklin D. Roosevelt; Harry S. Truman
- Preceded by: Joseph A. Broderick
- Succeeded by: Edward L. Norton

Personal details
- Born: May 13, 1885; Washington, D.C.
- Died: April 30, 1954 (aged 68)
- Education: Amherst College (BA,MA)

Ernest Gallaudet Draper or Ernest G. Draper (1885-1954) was an author, an assistant secretary of commerce at the United States Department of Commerce, and a member of the Board of Governors of the Federal Reserve System from March 30, 1938 until he had retired at the end of his term on September 1, 1950.

== Early life and career ==
Draper was born in 1885 in Washington, DC. Upon completing his bachelor's degree from Amherst College in 1906, he worked as a clerk in New York City.

From 1912 to 1920, he became president of American Creosoting Company, a company that used creosote to preserve railroad ties for the railroads of the early 1900s. However, the years 1918 to 1919 required him to take time from his company to serve as senior grade lieutenant in the U.S. Naval Reserve Force during World War I. As an officer in the Navy, he wrote the naval textbook Lectures in Navigation and the official report A Plan for Maintaining the Naval Auxiliary Reserve After the War. From his experience in writing the lectures in sea navigation, he wrote the 1919 book Navigating the Ship which was published by the publishing company David Van Nostrand.

He later became treasurer and vice president of the Hills Brothers Company, a date packing company, during the years 1920 to 1935. In 1934, he became a member of the National Labor Board; and in 1936, he had completed his masters of arts degree from Amherst College.

== Career ==
On August 5,1935, Draper was appointed by President Franklin D. Roosevelt as assistant secretary of commerce at the United States Department of Commerce. U.S. Commerce Secretary Daniel C. Roper (1933-1938) had stated:

Mr. Draper has been a valuable member of the Business Advisory Council (Note: The Business Council was created by Commerce Secretary Roper and investment banker Sidney Weinberg. The original name of the organization was the Business Advisory Council for the United States Department of Commerce) and thus has developed an appreciation of the common problems which the government and business are endeavoring to work out in harmony.

He was later appointed by President Roosevelt to the Board of Governors of the Federal Reserve, and started as member of the board on March 30, 1938. As a member of the Board, Draper focused on the role of small business. He published Small Business and Its Credit Problem in The Washington Post and Goods and Dollars in World Trade in the 1944 Federal Reserve Bulletin. He has on multiple occasions represented the Board before United States Congress as well as in academic settings.

He was a member of the following organizations:

- The New York State Commission on Unemployment (1930-1935)
- New York City Art Commission
- The National Labor Relations Board
- The President's Commission on Crop Insurance
- The American Economic Association
- The Academy of Political Science
- Business Advisory Council of the U.S. Department of Commerce

He had held the following positions:

- President of the American Association for Labor Legislation
- President of the Brooklyn Federation of Community Centers
- Trustee of the Brooklyn Museum of Fine Arts
- Vice president of the American Management Association

== Bibliography ==
Books/Articles by Ernest G. Draper
Title	Media	Role	Year
Navigating the Ship	Book	Author	1920
Can Business Prevent Unemployment	Book	Co-author	1935
Small Business and Its Credit Problem	Article	Author	1939
Methods of Minimizing the Effect of Business Depression on the Working Forces	Book	Co-author	1941
Goods and Dollars in World Trade	Article	Co-author	1944
Stirring Times, 1941-1949	Book	Co-author	1949
