= Edward L. Norton =

American central banker (1892–1966)

Member of the Federal Reserve Board of Governors
- In office September 2, 1950 – February 1, 1952
- President: Harry S. Truman
- Preceded by: Ernest G. Draper
- Succeeded by: James Robertson

Personal details
- Born: June 13, 1892 Blountsville, Alabama
- Died: April 12, 1966 (aged 73) Birmingham, Alabama
- Education: Birmingham–Southern College; University of Alabama (JD)

For engineer and scientist Edward L. Norton, please see Edward Lawry Norton.

Edward Lee Norton (June 3, 1892 – April 12, 1966) was an American banker that was a member of the Board of Governors of the Federal Reserve System from September 2, 1950 until February 1, 1952.

== Early life and career ==
Norton was born in Blountsville, Alabama, in 1892. He had earned his bachelor of science degree from Birmingham–Southern College in 1913. From 1913 to 1914, he was a student at the University of Alabama and would return to Birmingham-Southern College for this doctorate in law LL.D.. In 1915, he had started at the Munger family of companies as a private secretary to R.S. Munger of Munger Realty and, in 1924, he was promoted to executive vice president. In 1926, he became executive vice president of Munger Mortgage Company. In 1939, he left the mortgage company to accept his appointment as chairman of the board of the Birmingham branch of the Federal Reserve Bank of Atlanta.

Prior to his Federal Reserve Board of Governors position, he had held the following positions:

- President of the Birmingham Baseball Club
- Chairman of the board of the Florida Broadcasting Company of Jacksonville, Florida

In 1952, he married Edna Corrine Troy.

Edward L. Norton died of heart attack in his Birmingham, Alabama home on April 12, 1966.

== Career ==
Norton was appointed to the Board of Governors by President Harry Truman in 1950. He later resigned in 1952 to pursue business interests. Norton had written the following in his resignation letter to the president:

Since you are the inspiration or source of my appointment to the Board of Governors, I feel deeply indebted to you, and I covet the opportunity to reciprocate.

After leaving his position as governor, he later became chairman of the board and principal shareholder of the Voice of Alabama Inc., which had operated the following stations and/or corporations:

- WAPI, which is a commercial AM radio station in Birmingham, Alabama.
- WAFM-TV Birmingham, which is now WVTM-TV.
- Florida Broadcasting Company, which had operated WMBR (now WJXT) in Jacksonville, Florida.

On November 17, 1953, he was one of the 31 first members of the board of trustees of the Eisenhower Exchange Fellowship, Inc.
