= Edward Norton (diplomat) =

American diplomat and businessman (1874–1959)

Edward John Norton (Saint Paul, 29 December 1874 - Málaga, 29 May 1959) was an American diplomat and businessman, consul of the United States in Paraguay and Spain.

Edward Norton is the author of a memoir about the events of the Spanish Civil War in Málaga.

== Diplomatic career ==
After serving as consul of the United States in Asunción, Paraguay, he was appointed consul of the United States in Málaga, Spain, in 1909, where he remained until 1912. He also served as a diplomat in Málaga from 1916 to 1919.

After a long tour of duty around the world, including Bombay and Sydney, in 1927 he resigned as a member of the executive committee of the Personnel Board of the United States Diplomatic Service because he disagreed with the system of selecting personnel to fill consular vacancies. In Norton's view, political criteria took precedence over professional ones.

== Second Republic and Civil War ==
In 1931, he returned to Málaga to take over the presidency of Bevan House, a wine and raisin exporting company. After temporarily residing in the Miramar Hotel, he acquired a property in the Limonar area, where he moved to live with his wife, Helen Whitaker Norton. They named the villa with the name of Los Pinos (in English: The Pines). The property of Los Pinos has not been preserved, but the neighborhood of Málaga where the Nortons' residence was located is still known today as Los Pinos del Limonar.

Norton witnessed firsthand the proclamation of the Second Spanish Republic in 1931 and the beginning of the Civil War in Málaga.

Norton died in 1959 and was buried in the English Cemetery in Málaga.

His great-nephew, William Whitaker Harmon, sold the Los Pinos residence and sent most of the Nortons' possessions to his home in Chicago, in the United States. In addition to paintings, books and furniture, his nephew found twelve typewritten and bound volumes of his annual diaries, including a typewritten draft of a book entitled Death in Málaga.

In 1999, his great-nephew together with Enrique van Dulkem, another of the dignitary's descendants, decided to publish a first edition of four hundred copies of Norton's book. They were originally published in the United States and in English, the language in which they were written.

In 2004, a first Spanish translation was published by María José Navarrete Alonso, under the title Muerte en Málaga (in English: Death in Málaga) published by the University of Málaga in collaboration with other institutions.

In 2005, William Whitaker Harmon donated his uncle's original Civil War documents, on which he based his book Death in Málaga, to the University of Málaga.

== Death in Málaga ==
The book gathers his memoirs of the events that took place in Málaga during the Second Republic and the Civil War. It is a complete work of the events of that period, where the author shows a great ability to relate local events with the national and international process.

Free of political connotations, the author avoids the analysis of the facts in favor of the testimonial description, which gives his book a great historical value. Nevertheless, historians such as Andrés Arenas and Enrique Girón have pointed out that Norton “offers a very favorable testimony to Franco's military insurrection”.

== Publications ==
- Norton, Edward (1999). Death in Málaga. Chicago: Harmon Book.
