= Thévenin's theorem =

Theorem in electrical circuit analysis

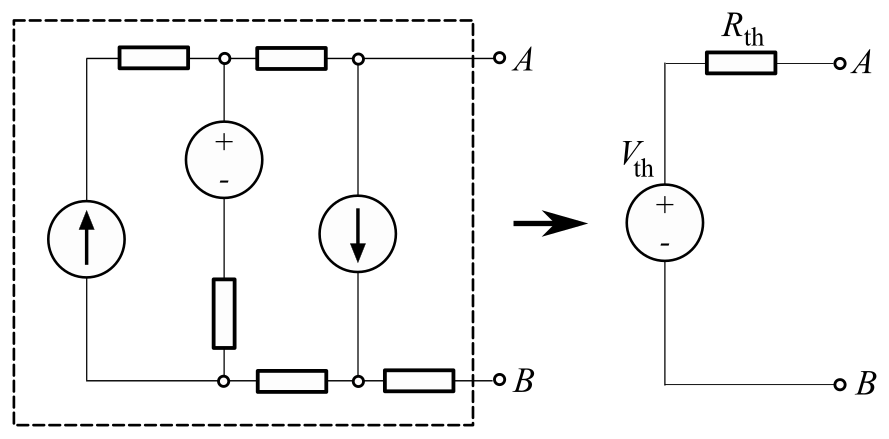
Fig. 1. Any black box containing only resistances, voltage sources and current sources, can be replaced by a Thévenin equivalent circuit consisting of an equivalent voltage source in series connection with an equivalent resistance.

As originally stated in terms of direct-current resistive circuits only, Thévenin's theorem states that "Any linear electrical network containing only voltage sources, current sources and resistances can be replaced at terminals A–B by an equivalent combination of a voltage source V_{th} in a series connection with a resistance R_{th}."

- The equivalent voltage V_{th} is the voltage obtained at terminals A–B of the network with terminals A–B open circuited.
- The equivalent resistance R_{th} is the resistance that the circuit between terminals A and B would have if all ideal voltage sources in the circuit were replaced by a short circuit and all ideal current sources were replaced by an open circuit (i.e., the sources are set to provide zero voltages and currents).
- If terminals A and B are connected to one another (short), then the current flowing from A and B will be $\frac{V_\mathrm{th}}{R_\mathrm{th}}$ according to the Thévenin equivalent circuit. This means that R_{th} could alternatively be calculated as V_{th} divided by the short-circuit current between A and B when they are connected together.

In circuit theory terms, the theorem allows any one-port network to be reduced to a single voltage source and a single impedance.

The theorem also applies to frequency domain AC circuits consisting of reactive (inductive and capacitive) and resistive impedances. It means the theorem applies for AC in an exactly same way to DC except that resistances are generalized to impedances.

The theorem was independently derived in 1853 by the German scientist Hermann von Helmholtz and in 1883 by Léon Charles Thévenin (1857–1926), an electrical engineer with France's national Postes et Télégraphes telecommunications organization.

Thévenin's theorem and its dual, Norton's theorem, are widely used to make circuit analysis simpler and to study a circuit's initial-condition and steady-state response. Thévenin's theorem can be used to convert any circuit's sources and impedances to a Thévenin equivalent; use of the theorem may in some cases be more convenient than use of Kirchhoff's circuit laws.

== A proof of the theorem ==
Various proofs have been given of Thévenin's theorem. Perhaps the simplest of these was the proof in Thévenin's original paper. A consensus exists that Thévenin's proof is both correct and general in its applicability. The proof goes as follows:

Consider an active network containing impedances, (constant-) voltage sources and (constant-) current sources. The configuration of the network can be anything. Access to the network is provided by a pair of terminals. Designate the voltage measured between the terminals as V_{θ}, as shown in the box on the left side of Figure 2.

Fig. 2. Figure used in the proof of Thévenin's theorem.

Suppose that the voltage sources within the box are replaced by short circuits, and the current sources by open circuits. If this is done, no voltage appears across the terminals, and it is possible to measure the impedance between the terminals. Call this impedance Z_{θ}.

Now suppose that one attaches some linear network to the terminals of the box, having impedance Z_{e}, as in Figure 2a. We wish to find the current I through Z_{e}. The answer is not obvious, since the terminal voltage will not be V_{θ} after Z_{e} is connected.

Instead, we imagine that we attach, in series with impedance Z_{e}, a source with electromotive force E equal to V_{θ} but directed to oppose V_{θ}, as shown in Figure 2b. No current will then flow through Z_{e} since E balances V_{θ}.

Next, we insert another source of electromotive force, E_{1}, in series with Z_{e}, where E_{1} has the same magnitude as E but is opposed in direction (see Figure 2c). The current, I_{1}, can be determined as follows: it is the current that would result from E_{1} acting alone, with all other sources (within the active network and the external network) set to zero. This current is, therefore,

$$I_1 = \frac{E_1}{Z_e+Z_\theta} = \frac{V_\theta}{Z_e+Z_\theta}$$

because Z_{e} is the impedance external to the box and Z_{θ} looking into the box when its sources are zero.

Finally, we note that E and E_{1} can be removed together without changing the current, and when they are removed, we are back to Figure 2a. Therefore, I_{1} is the current, I, that we are seeking, i.e.

$$I = \frac{V_\theta}{Z_e+Z_\theta}$$

thus, completing the proof. Figure 2d shows the Thévenin equivalent circuit.

== Helmholtz's proof ==
As noted, Thévenin's theorem was first discovered and published by the German scientist Hermann von Helmholtz in 1853, four years before Thévenin's birth. Thévenin's 1883 proof, described above, is nearer in spirit to modern methods of electrical engineering, and this may explain why his name is more commonly associated with the theorem. Helmholtz's earlier formulation of the problem reflects a more general approach that is closer to physics.

In his 1853 paper, Helmholtz was concerned with the electromotive properties of "physically extensive conductors", in particular, with animal tissue. He noted that earlier work by physiologist Emil du Bois-Reymond had shown that "every smallest part of a muscle that can be stimulated is capable of producing electrical currents." At this time, experiments were carried out by attaching a galvanometer at two points to a sample of animal tissue and measuring current flow through the external circuit. Since the goal of this work was to understand something about the internal properties of the tissue, Helmholtz wanted to find a way to relate those internal properties to the currents measured externally.

Helmholtz's starting point was a result published by Gustav Kirchhoff in 1848. Like Helmholtz, Kirchhoff was concerned with three-dimensional, electrically conducting systems. Kirchhoff considered a system consisting of two parts, which he labelled parts A and B. Part A (which played the part of the "active network" in Fig. 2 above) consisted of a collection of conducting bodies connected end to end, each body characterized by an electromotive force and a resistance. Part B was assumed to be connected to the endpoints of A via two wires. Kirchhoff then showed that "without changing the flow at any point in B, one can substitute for A a conductor in which an electromotive force is located which is equal to the sum of the voltage differences in A, and which has a resistance equal to the summed resistances of the elements of A".

In his 1853 paper, Helmholtz acknowledged Kirchhoff's result, but noted that it was only valid in the case that, "as in hydroelectric batteries", there are no closed current curves in A, but rather that all such curves pass through B. He therefore set out to generalize Kirchhoff's result to the case of an arbitrary, three-dimensional distribution of currents and voltage sources within system A.

Helmholtz began by providing a more general formulation than had previously been published of the superposition principle, which he expressed as follows:

If any system of conductors contains electromotive forces at various locations, the electrical voltage at every point in the system through which the current flows is equal to the algebraic sum of those voltages which each of the electromotive forces would produce independently of the others. And similarly, the components of the current intensity that are parallel to three perpendicular axes are equal to the sum of the corresponding components that belong to the individual forces.

Using this theorem, as well as Ohm's law, Helmholtz proved the following three theorems about the relation between the internal voltages and currents of "physical" system A, and the current flowing through the "linear" system B, which was assumed to be attached to A at two points on its surface:

1. For every conductor A, within whose interior electromotive forces are arbitrarily distributed, a certain distribution of electromotive forces can be specified on its surface, which would produce the same currents as the internal forces of A in every applied conductor B.
2. The voltages and current components inside the conductor A when an external circuit is attached are equal to the sum of the voltages and current components that occur in it in the absence of the attached circuit and those of the surface.
3. Different ways of distributing electromotive forces on the surface of the conductor A, which should give the same derived currents as its internal forces, can only differ by a difference that has the same constant value at all points on the surface.

From these, Helmholtz derived his final result:

If a physical conductor with constant electromotive forces in two specific points on its surface is connected to any linear conductor, then in its place one can always substitute a linear conductor with a certain electromotive force and a certain resistance, which in all applied linear conductors would excite exactly the same currents as the physical one. ... The resistance of the linear conductor to be substituted is equal to that of the body when a current is passed through it from the two entry points of the linear conductor.

He then noted that his result, derived for a general "physical system", also applied to "linear" (in a geometric sense) circuits like those considered by Kirchhoff:

What applies to every physical conductor also applies to the special case of a branched linear current system. Even if two specific points of such a system are connected to any other linear conductors, it behaves compared to them like a linear conductor of certain resistance, the magnitude of which can be found according to the well-known rules for branched lines, and of certain electromotive force, which is given by the voltage difference of the derived points as it existed before the added circuit.

This formulation of the theorem is essentially the same as Thévenin's, published 30 years later.

== Calculating the Thévenin equivalent ==
The Thévenin-equivalent circuit of a linear electrical circuit is a voltage source with voltage V_{th} in series with a resistance R_{th}.

The Thévenin-equivalent voltage V_{th} is the open-circuit voltage at the output terminals of the original circuit. When calculating a Thévenin-equivalent voltage, the voltage divider principle is often useful, by declaring one terminal to be V_{out} and the other terminal to be at the ground point.

The Thévenin-equivalent resistance R_{Th} is the resistance measured across points A and B "looking back" into the circuit. The resistance is measured after replacing all voltage- and current-sources with their internal resistances. That means an ideal voltage source is replaced with a short circuit, and an ideal current source is replaced with an open circuit. Resistance can then be calculated across the terminals using the formulae for series and parallel circuits. This method is valid only for circuits with independent sources. If there are dependent sources in the circuit, another method must be used such as connecting a test source across A and B and calculating the voltage across or current through the test source.

As a mnemonic, the Thevenin replacements for voltage and current sources can be remembered as the sources' values (meaning their voltage or current) are set to zero. A zero valued voltage source would create a potential difference of zero volts between its terminals, just like an ideal short circuit would do, with two leads touching; therefore the source is replaced with a short circuit. Similarly, a zero valued current source and an open circuit both pass zero current.

=== Example ===
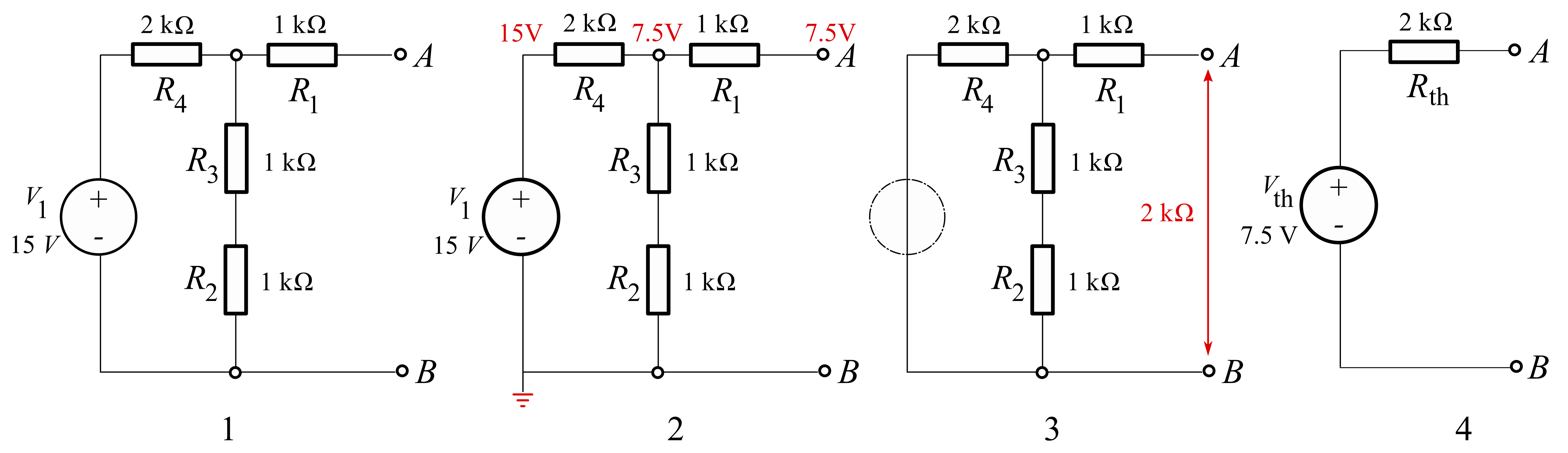
Fig. 3.: 1. Original circuit; 2. The equivalent voltage; 3. The equivalent resistance; 4. The equivalent circuit

In the example, calculating the equivalent voltage:
$$\begin{align}
V_\mathrm{th}
&= {R_2 + R_3 \over (R_2 + R_3) + R_4} \cdot V_\mathrm{1} \\
&= {1\,\mathrm{k}\Omega + 1\,\mathrm{k}\Omega \over (1\,\mathrm{k}\Omega + 1\,\mathrm{k}\Omega) + 2\,\mathrm{k}\Omega} \cdot 15 \,\mathrm{V} \\
&= {1 \over 2} \cdot 15 \, \mathrm{V} = 7.5 \,\mathrm{V}
\end{align}$$
(Notice that R_{1} is not taken into consideration, as above calculations are done in an open-circuit condition between A and B, therefore no current flows through this part, which means there is no current through R_{1} and therefore no voltage drop along this part.)

Calculating equivalent resistance (R_{x} || R_{y} is the total resistance of two parallel resistors):
$$\begin{align}
R_\mathrm{th} &= R_1 + \left[  \left( R_2 + R_3 \right) \| R_4 \right] \\
&= 1\,\mathrm{k}\Omega + \left[  \left( 1\,\mathrm{k}\Omega + 1\,\mathrm{k}\Omega \right) \| 2\,\mathrm{k}\Omega \right] \\
&= 1\,\mathrm{k}\Omega + \left({1 \over ( 1\,\mathrm{k}\Omega + 1\,\mathrm{k}\Omega )} + {1\over (2\,\mathrm{k}\Omega ) }\right)^{-1} = 2\,\mathrm{k}\Omega.
\end{align}$$

== Conversion to a Norton equivalent ==
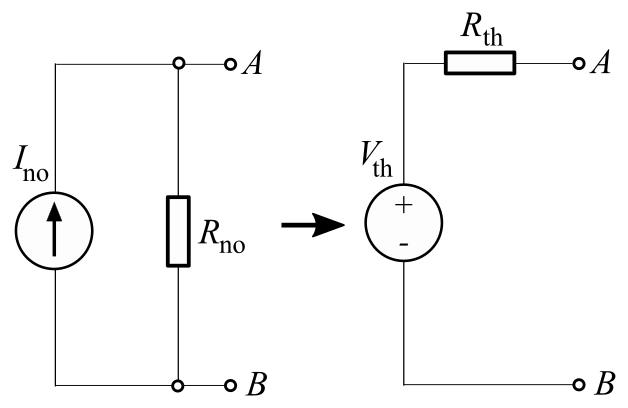
Fig. 4. Norton-Thevenin conversion

A Norton equivalent circuit is related to the Thévenin equivalent by
$$\begin{align}
R_\mathrm{th} &= R_\mathrm{no} \! \\
V_\mathrm{th} &= I_\mathrm{no} R_\mathrm{no} \! \\
I_\mathrm{no} &= \frac{V_\mathrm{th}}{R_\mathrm{th}} \!
\end{align}$$

== Practical limitations ==
- Many circuits are only linear over a certain range of values, thus the Thévenin equivalent is valid only within this linear range.
- The Thévenin equivalent has the equivalent I–V characteristic of an original circuit only from the point of view of a load connecting to the circuit.
- The power dissipation of the Thévenin equivalent is not necessarily identical to the power dissipation of the real system. However, the power dissipated by an external resistor between the two output terminals is the same regardless of how the internal circuit is implemented.

== In three-phase circuits ==
In 1933, A. T. Starr published a generalization of Thévenin's theorem in an article of the magazine Institute of Electrical Engineers Journal, titled A New Theorem for Active Networks, which states that any three-terminal active linear network can be substituted by three voltage sources with corresponding impedances, connected in wye or in delta.

== See also ==
- Extra element theorem
- Maximum power transfer theorem
- Millman's theorem
- Source transformation
