= Edward Lawry Norton =

American engineer and scientist

- Edward Lawry Norton
- Born: Edward Lawry Norton; July 28, 1898; Rockland, Maine
- Died: January 28, 1983 (aged 84); Chatham, New Jersey
- Education: Massachusetts Institute of Technology (BS); Columbia University (MA)
- Spouse: Blanche Lawry Norton
- Children: John L. Norton
- Engineering career
- Discipline: Electrical
- Employer: Bell Labs
- Significant advance: Norton's theorem

Edward Lawry Norton (July 28, 1898 – January 28, 1983) was an American acoustics and circuits engineer and scientist. He worked at Bell Labs and is known for Norton's theorem.

His areas of active research included network theory, acoustical systems, electromagnetic apparatus, and data transmission. A graduate of the Massachusetts Institute of Technology and Columbia University, he held nineteen patents on his work.

Edward L. Norton is known for development of the dual of Thevenin's equivalent circuit, currently referred to as Norton's equivalent circuit.

== Biography ==
Edward Lawry Norton served as a radio operator in the United States Navy from 1917 to 1919.

He attended the University of Maine for two years before transferring to the Massachusetts Institute of Technology, where he received a Bachelor of Science degree in electrical engineering in 1922. He received a Master of Arts degree from Columbia University in 1925.

He was interested in communications circuit theory and the transmission of data at high speeds over telephone lines. Norton began his telephone career in 1922 with Western Electric's engineering department, which later became Bell Laboratories.

Edward Lawry Norton was one of the founders of the Acoustical Society of America at the Bell Laboratories Building in New York City on December 27, 1928.

After the World War II, Norton worked on the circuits for the Nike missile control system.

In 1962, he was named an Institute of Radio Engineers fellow.

In 1963, Norton retired after serving as a head of the High Speed Data Terminals Department at Bell Lab in Holmdel Township, New Jersey.

Norton died on January 28, 1983, in King James Nursing Home, Chatham, New Jersey.

== Work ==
Norton and his associates at AT&T in the early 1920s are recognized as some of the first to perform pioneering work applying Thevenin's equivalent circuit and who referred to this concept simply as Thévenin's theorem. In 1926, he proposed the equivalent circuit using a current source and parallel resistor to assist in the design of recording instrumentation that was primarily current driven. This became known as Norton equivalent circuit.
