= Accelerometer =

Device that measures proper acceleration

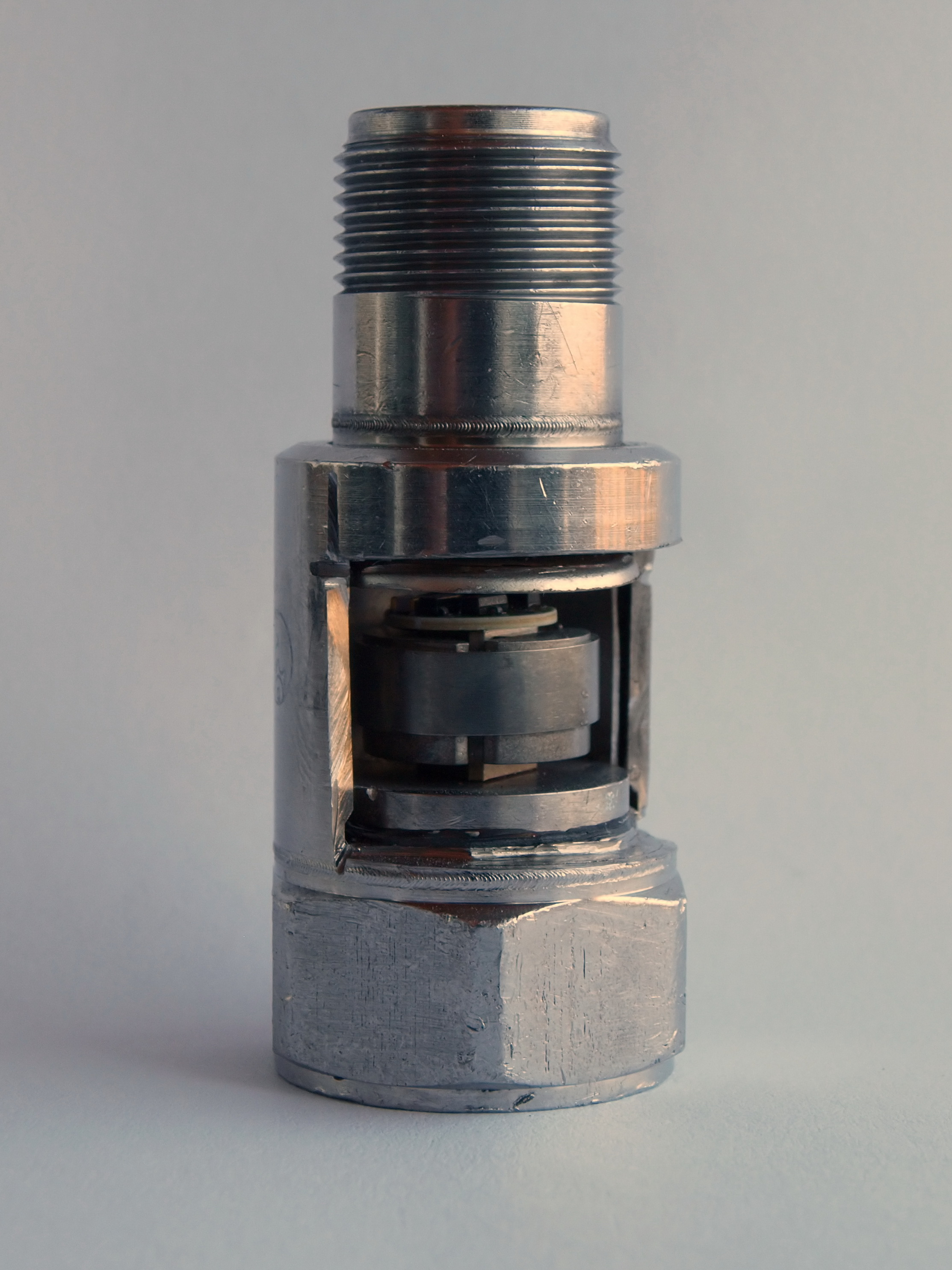
A typical accelerometer

An accelerometer is a device that measures the proper acceleration of an object. Proper acceleration is the acceleration (the rate of change of velocity) of the object relative to an observer who is in free fall (that is, relative to an inertial frame of reference). Proper acceleration is different from coordinate acceleration, which is acceleration with respect to a given coordinate system, which may or may not be accelerating. For example, an accelerometer at rest on the surface of the Earth will measure an acceleration due to Earth's gravity straight upwards of about g ≈ 9.81 m/s^{2}. By contrast, an accelerometer that is in free fall will measure zero acceleration.

Highly sensitive accelerometers are used in inertial navigation systems for aircraft and missiles. In unmanned aerial vehicles, accelerometers help to stabilize flight. Micromachined micro-electromechanical systems (MEMS) accelerometers are used in handheld electronic devices such as smartphones, cameras and video-game controllers to detect movement and orientation of these devices. Vibration in industrial machinery is monitored by accelerometers. Seismometers are sensitive accelerometers for monitoring ground movement such as earthquakes.

When two or more accelerometers are coordinated with one another, they can measure differences in proper acceleration, particularly gravity, over their separation in space—that is, the gradient of the gravitational field. Gravity gradiometry is useful because absolute gravity is a weak effect and depends on the local density of the Earth, which is quite variable.

A single-axis accelerometer measures acceleration along a specified axis. A multi-axis accelerometer detects both the magnitude and the direction of the proper acceleration, as a vector quantity, and is usually implemented as several single-axis accelerometers oriented along different axes.

== Physical principles ==
An accelerometer measures proper acceleration, which is the acceleration it experiences relative to freefall and is the acceleration felt by people and objects. Put another way, at any point in spacetime the equivalence principle guarantees the existence of a local inertial frame, and an accelerometer measures the acceleration relative to that frame. Such accelerations are popularly denoted g-force; i.e., in comparison to standard gravity.

An accelerometer at rest relative to the Earth's surface will indicate approximately 1 g upwards because the Earth's surface exerts a normal force upwards relative to the local inertial frame (the frame of a freely falling object near the surface). To obtain the acceleration due to motion with respect to the Earth, this "gravity offset" must be subtracted and corrections made for effects caused by the Earth's rotation relative to the inertial frame.

The reason for the appearance of a gravitational offset is Einstein's equivalence principle, which states that the effects of gravity on an object are indistinguishable from acceleration. When held fixed in a gravitational field by, for example, applying a ground reaction force or an equivalent upward thrust, the reference frame for an accelerometer (its own casing) accelerates upwards with respect to a free-falling reference frame. The effects of this acceleration are indistinguishable from any other acceleration experienced by the instrument so that an accelerometer cannot detect the difference between sitting in a rocket on the launch pad, and being in the same rocket in deep space while it uses its engines to accelerate at 1 g. For similar reasons, an accelerometer will read zero during any type of free fall. This includes use in a coasting spaceship in deep space far from any mass, a spaceship orbiting the Earth, an airplane in a parabolic "zero-g" arc, or any free-fall in a vacuum. Another example is free-fall at a sufficiently high altitude that atmospheric effects can be neglected.

However, this does not include a (non-free) fall in which air resistance produces drag forces that reduce the acceleration until constant terminal velocity is reached. At terminal velocity, the accelerometer will indicate 1 g acceleration upwards. For the same reason a skydiver, upon reaching terminal velocity, does not feel as though he or she were in "free-fall", but rather experiences a feeling similar to being supported (at 1 g) on a "bed" of uprushing air.

Acceleration is quantified in the SI unit metres per second per second (m/s^{2}), in the cgs unit gal (Gal), or popularly in terms of standard gravity (g).

For the practical purpose of finding the acceleration of objects with respect to the Earth, such as for use in an inertial navigation system, a knowledge of local gravity is required. This can be obtained either by calibrating the device at rest, or from a known model of gravity at the approximate current position.

== Structure ==
Apple suspended in an upward-moving elevator. It moves downward during initial acceleration and upward during deceleration (stopping).

=== Mechanical examples ===
A basic mechanical accelerometer is a damped proof mass on a spring. When the accelerometer experiences an acceleration, Newton's third law causes the spring's compression (or extension) to adjust to exert an equivalent force on the mass to counteract the acceleration. Since the spring's force scales linearly with the length change (according to Hooke's law) and because the spring constant and mass are known constants, a measurement of the spring's compression (or extension) is also a measurement of acceleration. The system is damped to prevent oscillations of the mass and spring interfering with measurements. However, the damping causes accelerometers to have a frequency response.

Many animals have sensory organs to detect acceleration, especially gravity. In these, the proof mass is usually one or more crystals of calcium carbonate otoliths (Latin for "ear stone") or statoconia, acting against a bed of hairs connected to neurons. The hairs form the springs, with the neurons as sensors. The damping is usually by a fluid. Many vertebrates, including humans, have these structures in their inner ears. Most invertebrates have similar organs, but not as part of their hearing organs. These are called statocysts.

Mechanical accelerometers are often designed so that an electronic circuit senses a small amount of motion, then pushes on the proof mass with some type of linear motor to keep the proof mass from moving far. The motor might be an electromagnet or in very small accelerometers, electrostatic. Since the circuit's electronic behavior can be carefully designed, and the proof mass does not move far, these designs can be very stable (i.e. they do not oscillate), very linear with a controlled frequency response. (This is called servo mode design.)

In mechanical accelerometers, measurement is often electrical, piezoelectric, piezoresistive or capacitive. Piezoelectric accelerometers use piezoceramic sensors (e.g. lead zirconate titanate) or single crystals (e.g. quartz, tourmaline). They are unmatched in high frequency measurements, low packaged weight, and resistance to high temperatures. Piezoresistive accelerometers resist shock (very high accelerations) better. Capacitive accelerometers typically use a silicon micro-machined sensing element. They measure low frequencies well.

=== Micro-electromechanical examples ===
Simplified diagram of a MEMS accelerometer. As acceleration causes the suspended mass (brown) to move up or down, the capacitance between its combs and the surrounding fixed combs (yellow) changes, which is measured by external electronics.

Modern mechanical accelerometers are often small micro-electro-mechanical systems (MEMS), and are often very simple MEMS devices, consisting of little more than a cantilever beam with a proof mass (also known as seismic mass). Damping results from the residual gas sealed in the device. As long as the Q-factor is not too low, damping does not result in a lower sensitivity.

Under the influence of external accelerations, the proof mass deflects from its neutral position. This deflection is measured in an analog or digital manner. Most commonly, the capacitance between a set of fixed beams and a set of beams attached to the proof mass is measured. This method is simple, reliable, and inexpensive. Integrating piezoresistors in the springs to detect spring deformation, and thus deflection, is a good alternative, although a few more process steps are needed during the fabrication sequence. For very high sensitivities quantum tunnelling is also used; this requires a dedicated process making it very expensive. Optical measurement has been demonstrated in laboratory devices.

Another MEMS-based accelerometer is a thermal (or convective) accelerometer. It contains a small heater in a very small dome. This heats the air or other fluid inside the dome. The thermal bubble acts as the proof mass. An accompanying temperature sensor (like a thermistor; or thermopile) in the dome measures the temperature in one location of the dome. This measures the location of the heated bubble within the dome. When the dome is accelerated, the colder, higher density fluid pushes the heated bubble. The measured temperature changes. The temperature measurement is interpreted as acceleration. The fluid provides the damping. Gravity acting on the fluid provides the spring. Since the proof mass is very lightweight gas, and not held by a beam or lever, thermal accelerometers can survive high shocks. Another variation uses a wire to both heat the gas and detect the change in temperature. The change of temperature changes the resistance of the wire. A two dimensional accelerometer can be economically constructed with one dome, one bubble and two measurement devices.

Most micromechanical accelerometers operate in-plane, that is, they are designed to be sensitive only to a direction in the plane of the die. By integrating two devices perpendicularly on a single die a two-axis accelerometer can be made. By adding another out-of-plane device, three axes can be measured. Such a combination may have much lower misalignment error than three discrete models combined after packaging.

Micromechanical accelerometers are available in a wide variety of measuring ranges, reaching up to thousands of g's. The designer must compromise between sensitivity and the maximum acceleration that can be measured.

== Applications ==
=== Engineering ===
Accelerometers can be used to measure vehicle acceleration. Accelerometers can be used to measure vibration on cars, machines, buildings, process control systems and safety installations. They can also be used to measure seismic activity, inclination, machine vibration, dynamic distance and speed with or without the influence of gravity. Applications for accelerometers that measure gravity, wherein an accelerometer is specifically configured for use in gravimetry, are called gravimeters.

=== Biology ===
Accelerometers are also increasingly used in the biological sciences. High frequency recordings of bi-axial or tri-axial acceleration allows the discrimination of behavioral patterns while animals are out of sight. Furthermore, recordings of acceleration allow researchers to quantify the rate at which an animal is expending energy in the wild, by either determination of limb-stroke frequency or measures such as overall dynamic body acceleration Such approaches have mostly been adopted by marine scientists due to an inability to study animals in the wild using visual observations, however an increasing number of terrestrial biologists are adopting similar approaches. For example, accelerometers have been used to study flight energy expenditure of Harris's Hawk (Parabuteo unicinctus). Researchers are also using smartphone accelerometers to collect and extract mechano-biological descriptors of resistance exercise. Increasingly, researchers are deploying accelerometers with additional technology, such as cameras or microphones, to better understand animal behaviour in the wild (for example, hunting behaviour of Canada lynx).

=== Industry ===
Accelerometers are also used for machinery health monitoring to report the vibration and its changes in time of shafts at the bearings of rotating equipment such as turbines, pumps, fans, rollers, compressors, or bearing fault which, if not attended to promptly, can lead to costly repairs. Accelerometer vibration data allows the user to monitor machines and detect these faults before the rotating equipment fails completely.

=== Building and structural monitoring ===
Accelerometers are widely used in structural health monitoring (SHM) of buildings, bridges and other civil infrastructure to record the dynamic response under ambient and forced loads (e.g., wind, traffic, machinery and earthquakes). From these vibration records, engineers estimate modal properties—natural frequencies, damping ratios and mode shapes—often using operational modal analysis (OMA) techniques for in-service structures. These parameters are trended over time for condition assessment and model updating.

In seismic regions, arrays of accelerometers installed in buildings and other structures provide strong-motion data for rapid post-event assessments and long-term performance studies. In the United States, the U.S. Geological Survey's National Strong-Motion Project (NSMP) operates structural arrays and distributes building and structural records via the Center for Engineering Strong Motion Data (CESMD).

Instrumentation and data-quality practices for building vibration measurements are guided by international standards. ISO 4866 provides principles for measuring the vibration of fixed structures and evaluating vibration effects based on structural response, while ISO 10137 gives serviceability recommendations for buildings and walkways with respect to human perception, contents and the structure itself.

Choice of accelerometer technology depends on frequency range and amplitude. Piezoelectric accelerometers are common for higher-frequency, higher-amplitude measurements, whereas low-noise MEMS accelerometers have become attractive for low-frequency building and bridge monitoring and for dense or wireless deployments due to cost and power advantages. Recent evaluations and developments show that appropriately selected MEMS devices can identify modal parameters with acceptable accuracy for SHM and have been integrated into high-sensitivity wireless nodes.

Networked and wireless smart-sensor approaches allow distributed monitoring at scale. Reviews document the shift from wired to wireless SHM systems and the maturation of wireless smart-sensor networks for tasks such as ambient-vibration modal identification and continuous trending.

Accelerometers are often fused with other sensors to improve displacement and drift estimation, especially for large or flexible structures. GNSS provides quasi-static and very-low-frequency motion that complements accelerometer-based dynamics; recent studies report accurate dynamic displacement retrieval using high-rate or multi-GNSS solutions combined with accelerometers.

Beyond permanently instrumented assets, indirect and crowdsourced approaches using smartphone accelerometers have been explored, particularly for bridges. Research has shown that modal frequencies—and in some cases spatial vibration characteristics—can be estimated from accelerometer data collected by vehicles crossing bridges, offering a complementary, low-cost screening tool for large inventories. Related work has also evaluated smartphone-based ambient vibration monitoring of buildings.

Long-term case studies illustrate large-scale deployments. Hong Kong's Wind and Structural Health Monitoring System (WASHMS) has instrumented the Tsing Ma Bridge since 1997; subsequent publications report decades of monitoring for load and response in service. Scotland's Queensferry Crossing was equipped with a comprehensive SHM system including thousands of sensors, and Sydney Harbour Bridge has been reported as instrumented with thousands of sensors for real-time monitoring.

SHM data are used for continuous condition tracking, event-triggered assessments (e.g., after earthquakes), and to support asset management decisions. In bridge engineering, guidance from transportation agencies describes how field data—including accelerometer measurements—can be integrated with inspection and nondestructive evaluation to improve load-rating reliability and maintenance planning.

=== Medical applications ===
Zoll's AED Plus uses CPR-D•padz which contain an accelerometer to measure the depth of CPR chest compressions.

Within the last several years, several companies have produced and marketed sports watches for runners that include footpods, containing accelerometers to help determine the speed and distance for the runner wearing the unit.

In Belgium, accelerometer-based step counters are promoted by the government to encourage people to walk a few thousand steps each day.

Herman Digital Trainer uses accelerometers to measure strike force in physical training.

It has been suggested to build football helmets with accelerometers in order to measure the impact of head collisions. The US Army Research Laboratory developed the Three-Axis Acceleration Switch which has been suggested for this application.

Accelerometers have been used to calculate gait parameters, such as stance and swing phase. This kind of sensor can be used to measure or monitor people.

=== Navigation ===
An inertial navigation system is a navigation aid that uses a computer and motion sensors (accelerometers) to continuously calculate via dead reckoning the position, orientation, and velocity (direction and speed of movement) of a moving object without the need for external references. Other terms used to refer to inertial navigation systems or closely related devices include inertial guidance system, inertial reference platform, and many other variations.

An accelerometer alone is unsuitable to determine changes in altitude over distances where the vertical decrease of gravity is significant, such as for aircraft and rockets. In the presence of a gravitational gradient, the calibration and data reduction process is numerically unstable.

=== Transport ===
Accelerometers are used to detect apogee in both professional and in amateur rocketry.

Accelerometers are also being used in Intelligent Compaction rollers. Accelerometers are used alongside gyroscopes in inertial navigation systems.

One of the most common uses for MEMS accelerometers is in airbag deployment systems for modern automobiles. In this case, the accelerometers are used to detect the rapid negative acceleration of the vehicle to determine when a collision has occurred and the severity of the collision. Another common automotive use is in electronic stability control systems, which use a lateral accelerometer to measure cornering forces. The widespread use of accelerometers in the automotive industry has pushed their cost down dramatically. Another automotive application is the monitoring of noise, vibration, and harshness (NVH), conditions that cause discomfort for drivers and passengers and may also be indicators of mechanical faults.

Tilting trains use accelerometers and gyroscopes to calculate the required tilt.

=== Volcanology ===
Modern electronic accelerometers are used in remote sensing devices intended for the monitoring of active volcanoes to detect the motion of magma.

=== Consumer electronics ===
Accelerometers are increasingly being incorporated into personal electronic devices to detect the orientation of the device, for example, a display screen.

A free-fall sensor (FFS) is an accelerometer used to detect if a system has been dropped and is falling. It can then apply safety measures such as parking the head of a hard disk to prevent a head crash and resulting data loss upon impact. This device is included in the many common computer and consumer electronic products that are produced by a variety of manufacturers. It is also used in some data loggers to monitor handling operations for shipping containers. The length of time in free fall is used to calculate the height of drop and to estimate the shock to the package.

==== Motion input ====
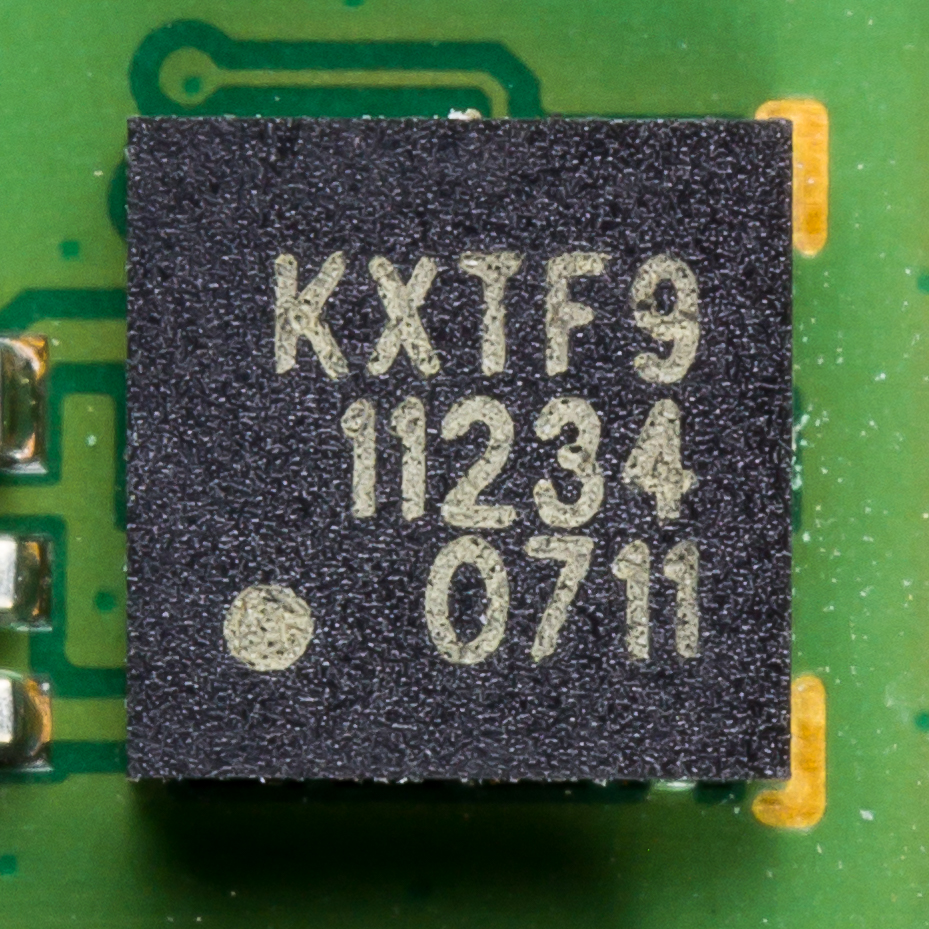
Tri-axis Digital Accelerometer by Kionix, inside Motorola Xoom

Some smartphones, digital audio players and personal digital assistants contain accelerometers for user interface control; often the accelerometer is used to present landscape or portrait views of the device's screen, based on the way the device is being held. Apple has included an accelerometer in every generation of iPhone, iPad, and iPod touch, as well as in every iPod nano since the 4th generation. Along with orientation view adjustment, accelerometers in mobile devices can also be used as pedometers, in conjunction with specialized applications.

Automatic Collision Notification (ACN) systems also use accelerometers in a system to call for help in event of a vehicle crash. Prominent ACN systems include OnStar AACN service, Ford Link's 911 Assist, Toyota's Safety Connect, Lexus Link, or BMW Assist. Many accelerometer-equipped smartphones also have ACN software available for download. ACN systems are activated by detecting crash-strength accelerations.

Accelerometers are used in vehicle Electronic stability control systems to measure the vehicle's actual movement. A computer compares the vehicle's actual movement to the driver's steering and throttle input. The stability control computer can selectively brake individual wheels and/or reduce engine power to minimize the difference between driver input and the vehicle's actual movement. This can help prevent the vehicle from spinning or rolling over.

Some pedometers use an accelerometer to more accurately measure the number of steps taken and distance traveled than a mechanical sensor can provide.

Nintendo's Wii video game console uses a controller called a Wii Remote that contains a three-axis accelerometer and was designed primarily for motion input. Users also have the option of buying an additional motion-sensitive attachment, the Nunchuk, so that motion input could be recorded from both of the user's hands independently. Is also used on the Nintendo 3DS system.

Sleep phase alarm clocks use accelerometric sensors to detect movement of a sleeper, so that it can wake the person when he/she is not in REM phase, in order to awaken the person more easily.

==== Sound recording ====
A microphone or eardrum is a membrane that responds to oscillations in air pressure. These oscillations cause acceleration, so accelerometers can be used to record sound. A 2012 study found that voices can be detected in 93% of typical daily situations by accelerometers like those in smartphones fixed to the sternum.

Conversely, carefully designed sounds can cause accelerometers to report false data. One study tested 20 models of (MEMS) smartphone accelerometers and found that a majority were susceptible to this attack.

==== Orientation sensing ====
A number of 21st-century devices use accelerometers to align the screen depending on the direction the device is held (e.g., switching between portrait and landscape modes). Such devices include many tablet PCs and some smartphones and digital cameras. The Amida Simputer, a handheld Linux device launched in 2004, was the first commercial handheld to have a built-in accelerometer. It incorporated many gesture-based interactions using this accelerometer, including page-turning, zoom-in and zoom-out of images, change of portrait to landscape mode, and many simple gesture-based games.

As of January 2009, almost all new mobile phones and digital cameras contain at least a tilt sensor and sometimes an accelerometer for the purpose of auto image rotation, motion-sensitive mini-games, and correcting shake when taking photographs.

==== Image stabilization ====
Camcorders use accelerometers for image stabilization, either by moving optical elements to adjust the light path to the sensor to cancel out unintended motions or digitally shifting the image to smooth out detected motion. Some stills cameras use accelerometers for anti-blur capturing. The camera holds off capturing the image when the camera is moving. When the camera is still (if only for a millisecond, as could be the case for vibration), the image is captured. An example of the application of this technology is the Glogger VS2, a phone application which runs on Symbian based phones with accelerometers such as the Nokia N96. Some digital cameras contain accelerometers to determine the orientation of the photo being taken and also for rotating the current picture when viewing.

==== Device integrity ====
Many laptops feature an accelerometer which is used to detect drops. If a drop is detected, the heads of the hard disk are parked to avoid data loss and possible head or disk damage by the ensuing shock.

=== Gravimetry ===
A gravimeter, or gravitometer, is an instrument used in gravimetry for measuring the local gravitational field. A gravimeter is a type of accelerometer, except that accelerometers are susceptible to all vibrations including noise, that cause oscillatory accelerations. This is counteracted in the gravimeter by integral vibration isolation and signal processing. Though the essential principle of design is the same as in accelerometers, gravimeters are typically designed to be much more sensitive than accelerometers in order to measure very tiny changes within the Earth's gravity, of 1 g. In contrast, other accelerometers are often designed to measure 1000 g or more, and many perform multi-axial measurements. The constraints on temporal resolution are usually less for gravimeters, so that resolution can be increased by processing the output with a longer "time constant".

== Types of accelerometer ==
- Bulk micromachined capacitive
- Bulk micromachined piezoelectric resistive
- Capacitive spring mass system base
- DC response
- Electromechanical servo (servo force balance)
- High gravity
- High temperature
- Laser accelerometer
- Low frequency
- Magnetic induction
- Modally tuned impact hammers
- Null-balance
- Optical
- Pendulous integrating gyroscopic accelerometer (PIGA)
- Piezoelectric accelerometer
- Quantum (rubidium atom cloud, laser cooled)
- Resonance
- Seat pad accelerometers
- Shear mode accelerometer
- Strain gauge
- Surface acoustic wave (SAW)
- Surface micromachined capacitive (MEMS)
- Thermal (submicrometre CMOS process)
- Triaxial
- Vacuum diode with flexible anode
- potentiometric type
- LVDT type accelerometer

== Exploits and privacy concerns ==
Accelerometer data, which can be accessed by third-party apps without user permission in many mobile devices, has been used to infer rich information about users based on the recorded motion patterns (e.g., driving behavior, level of intoxication, age, gender, touchscreen inputs, geographic location). If done without a user's knowledge or consent, this is referred to as an inference attack. Additionally, millions of smartphones could be vulnerable to software cracking via accelerometers.

== See also ==
- Accelerograph
- Degrees of freedom
- g-force
- Geophone
- Gyroscope
- Inclinometer
- Inertial measurement unit
- Inertial navigation system
- Magnetometer
- Seismometer
- Vibration calibrator
