= Norton's theorem =

DC circuit analysis technique

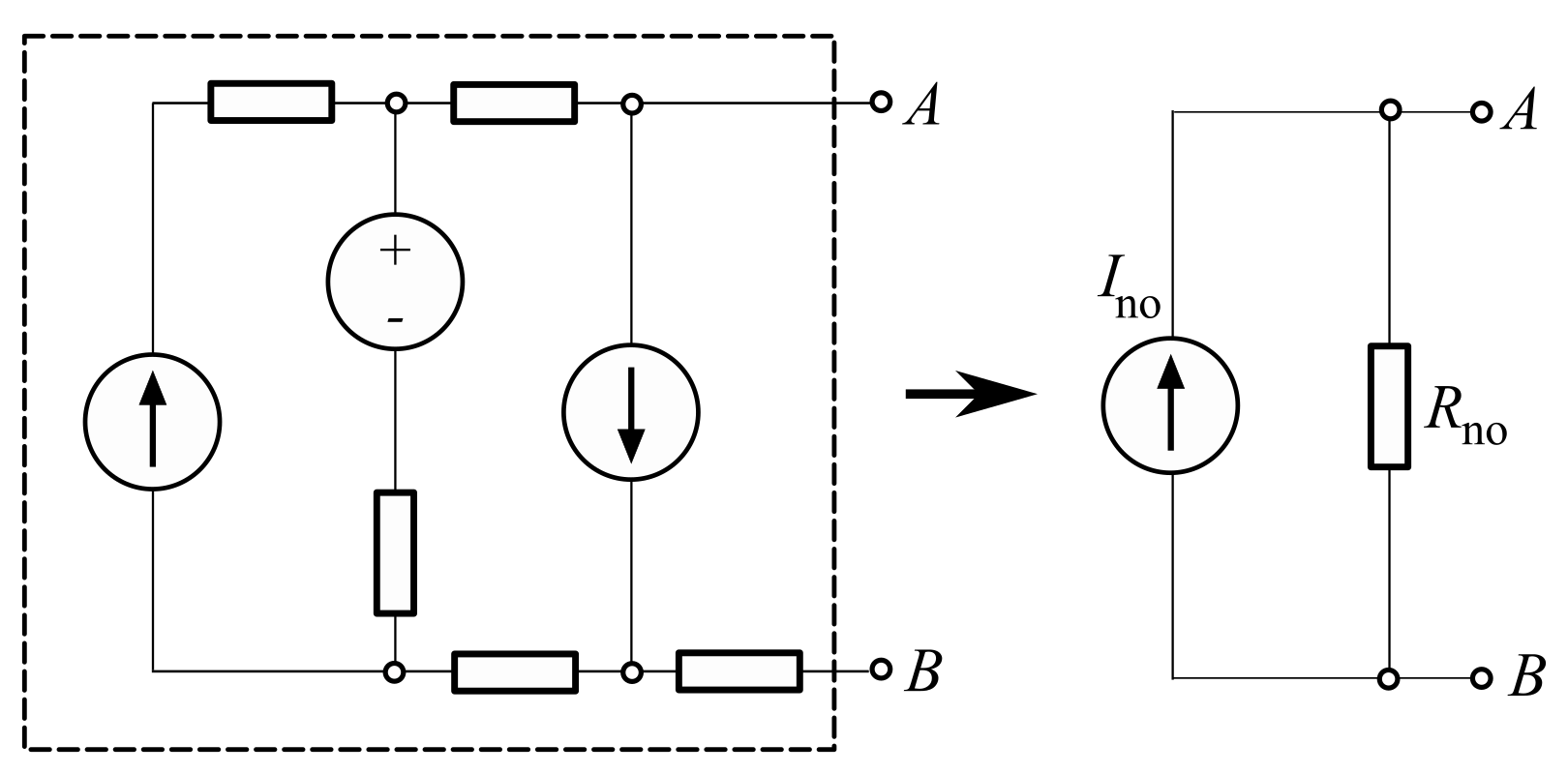
Any black box containing resistances only and voltage and current sources can be replaced by an equivalent circuit consisting of an equivalent current source in parallel connection with an equivalent resistance.

Edward Lawry Norton

In direct-current circuit theory, Norton's theorem, also called the Mayer–Norton theorem, is a simplification that can be applied to networks made of linear time-invariant resistances, voltage sources, and current sources. At a pair of terminals of the network, it can be replaced by a current source and a single resistor in parallel.

For alternating current (AC) systems the theorem can be applied to reactive impedances as well as resistances. The Norton equivalent circuit is used to represent any network of linear sources and impedances at a given frequency.

Norton's theorem and its dual, Thévenin's theorem, are widely used for circuit analysis simplification and to study circuit's initial-condition and steady-state response.

Norton's theorem was independently derived in 1926 by Siemens & Halske researcher Hans Ferdinand Mayer and Bell Labs engineer Edward Lawry Norton.

To find the Norton equivalent of a linear time-invariant circuit, the Norton current $I_\mathrm{no}$ is calculated as the current flowing at the two terminals $A$ and $B$ of the original circuit that is now short (zero impedance between the terminals). The Norton resistance $R_\mathrm{no}$ is found by calculating the output voltage $V_\mathrm{o}$ produced at $A$ and $B$ with no resistance or load connected to, then $\textstyle R_\mathrm{no} = {V_\mathrm{o} \over I_\mathrm{no} }$; equivalently, this is the resistance between the terminals with all (independent) voltage sources short-circuited and independent current sources open-circuited (i.e., each independent source is set to produce zero energy). This is equivalent to calculating the Thevenin resistance.

When there are dependent sources, the more general method must be used. The voltage at the terminals is calculated for an injection of a 1 ampere test current at the terminals. This voltage divided by the 1 A current is the Norton impedance $R_\mathrm{no}$ (in ohms). This method must be used if the circuit contains dependent sources, but it can be used in all cases even when there are no dependent sources.

== Example of a Norton equivalent circuit ==
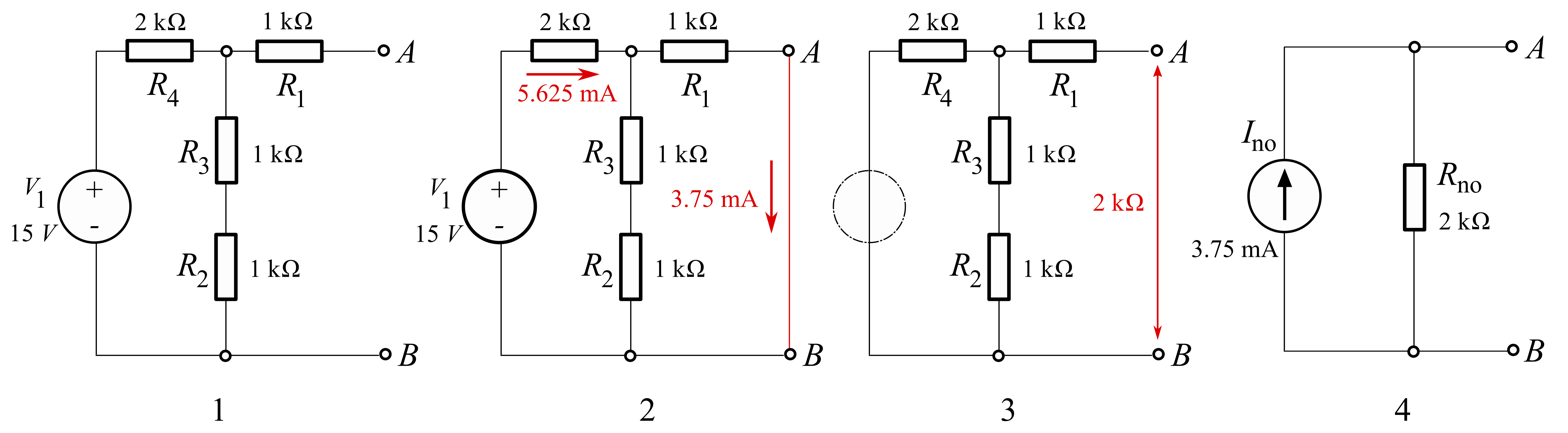
1. The original circuit; 2. Calculating the equivalent output current; 3. Calculating the equivalent resistance; 4. Design the Norton equivalent circuit

In the example, the total current $I_\mathrm{total}$ is given by:
$$I_\mathrm{total} = {15\,\mathrm{V} \over 2\,\mathrm{k}\Omega + 1\,\mathrm{k}\Omega \parallel (1\,\mathrm{k}\Omega + 1\,\mathrm{k}\Omega)} = 5.625\,\mathrm{mA}.$$

The current through the load is then, using the current divider rule:
$$\begin{align}
I_\mathrm{no} & = {1\,\mathrm{k}\Omega + 1\,\mathrm{k}\Omega \over 1\,\mathrm{k}\Omega + 1\,\mathrm{k}\Omega + 1\,\mathrm{k}\Omega} \cdot I_\mathrm{total} \\[5pt]
& = {2\over3} \cdot 5.625\,\mathrm{mA} = 3.75\,\mathrm{mA}.
\end{align}$$

And the equivalent resistance looking back into the circuit is:
$$R_\mathrm{no} = 1\,\mathrm{k}\Omega + (2\,\mathrm{k}\Omega \parallel (1\,\mathrm{k}\Omega + 1\,\mathrm{k}\Omega)) = 2\,\mathrm{k}\Omega.$$

So the equivalent circuit is a 3.75 mA current source in parallel with a 2 kΩ resistor.

== Conversion to a Thévenin equivalent ==
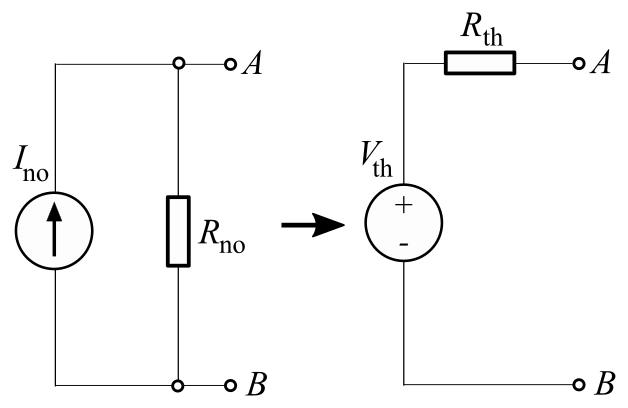
To a Thévenin equivalent

A Norton equivalent circuit is related to the Thévenin equivalent by the equations:
$$\begin{align}
& R_{\rm th} = R_{\rm no} \\[1pt]
& V_{\rm th} = I_{\rm no} R_{\rm no} \\[1pt]
& I_{\rm no} = \frac{V_{\rm th}}{R_{\rm th}} \\[1pt]
\end{align}$$
An original circuit and its Thévenin and Norton equivalents have the same voltage between the two open-circuited terminals, and the same short-circuited current in between.

== Queueing theory ==
The passive circuit equivalent of "Norton's theorem" in queuing theory is called the Chandy Herzog Woo theorem. In a reversible queueing system, it is often possible to replace an uninteresting subset of queues by a single (FCFS or PS) queue with an appropriately chosen service rate.

== See also ==
- Ohm's law
- Millman's theorem
- Source transformation
- Superposition theorem
- Thévenin's theorem
- Maximum power transfer theorem
- Extra element theorem
