= Proof mass =

Sample used for measurements

A proof mass or test mass is a known quantity of mass used in a measuring instrument as a reference for the measurement of an unknown quantity.

A mass used to calibrate a weighing scale is sometimes called a calibration mass or calibration weight.

A wide variety of calibration masses

There is a large number of varieties, of masses, the lightest that are commercialy available are 0.05 mg, the largest commercial proof mass in the world, is 4,45 MN deadweight machine in Gaithersburg, Maryland, USA weighing 453.592 kg.

A proof mass that deforms a spring in an accelerometer is sometimes called the seismic mass. In a convective accelerometer, a fluid proof mass may be employed.

== See also ==
- Calibration, checking or adjustment by comparison with a standard
- Control variable, the experimental element that is constant and unchanged throughout a scientific investigation
- Test particle, an idealized model of an object in which all physical properties are assumed to be negligible, except for the property being studied
