= Dualism (disambiguation) =

Dualism is a family of views that divide a domain or phenomenon into two separate principles or kinds.

Dualism or Dualist may also refer to:

== Philosophy ==
- Cosmological dualism, the theological or spiritual view that there are only two fundamental concepts, such as "good" and "evil", and that these two concepts are in every way opposed to one another
  - Dualism (Indian philosophy), the belief held by certain schools of Indian philosophy that reality is fundamentally composed of two parts
- Mind–body dualism, or substance dualism, a philosophical view which holds that mental phenomena are, at least in certain respects, not physical phenomena, or that the mind and the body are distinct and separable from one another
- Property dualism, a view in the philosophy of mind and metaphysics which holds that, although the world is composed of just one kind of substance—the physical kind—there exist two distinct kinds of properties: physical properties and mental properties
  - Epistemological dualism, the epistemological question of whether the world we see around us is the real world itself or merely an internal perceptual copy of that world generated by neural processes in our brain
- Ethical dualism, the view that good and evil are antagonistic forces that govern the world and are locked in a perpetual conflict
- Soul dualism, the belief that a person has two (or more) kinds of souls
- Dualism (cybernetics), idea by Norbert Wiener that there exists a fundamental division between information and matter or energy

== Politics and law ==
- Opposition to hierocracy (medieval), separation of temporal and spiritual power
- Monism and dualism in international law, a principle in contending that international and domestic law are distinct systems of law, and that international law only applies to the extent that it does not conflict with domestic law
- Separation of powers, in particular the Dutch convention of ministers/administrators not being legislators/elected assembly members
- Dual mandate, one person simultaneously holding two political (especially elective) offices
- Dual monarchy, a confederal arrangement closer than a personal union

== Media ==
- Dualism (album), a 2011 album by Dutch metal band Textures
- Dualist (album), a 2011 album by Taken by Cars
- Dualism, a novel by Bill DeSmedt

== See also ==
- Bipartite (disambiguation)
- Dichotomy
- Dilemma
- Dual (disambiguation)
- Duality (disambiguation)
- Monism
