= Duality =

Duality may refer to:

== Mathematics ==
- Duality (mathematics), a mathematical concept
  - Dual (category theory), a formalization of mathematical duality
  - Duality (optimization)
  - Duality (order theory), a concept regarding binary relations
  - Duality (projective geometry), general principle of projective geometry
  - Duality principle (Boolean algebra), the extension of order-theoretic duality to Boolean algebras
  - S-duality (homotopy theory)
- List of dualities § Mathematics

== Philosophy, logic, and psychology ==
- Dualistic cosmology, a twofold division in several spiritual and religious worldviews
- Dualism (philosophy of mind), where the body and mind are considered to be irreducibly distinct
- De Morgan's laws, specifically the ability to generate the dual of any logical expression
- Complementary duality of Carl Jung's functions and types in Socionics
- Duality (CoPs), refers to the notion of a duality in a Community of Practice

== Science ==
=== Electrical and mechanical ===
- Duality (electrical circuits), regarding isomorphism of electrical circuits
- Duality (mechanical engineering), regarding isomorphism of some mechanical laws

=== Physics ===
- AdS/CFT correspondence (anti de Sitter/conformal field theory correspondence), sometimes called the Maldacena duality
- Dual resonance model
- Duality (electricity and magnetism)
- Englert–Greenberger duality relation
- Holographic duality
- Kramers–Wannier duality
- List of dualities § Physics
- Mirror symmetry (string theory)
- Montonen–Olive duality
- Mysterious duality
- String duality, a class of symmetries
  - S-duality
  - T-duality
  - U-duality
- Wave–particle duality

== Music ==
=== Albums ===
- Duality (Peter Leitch and John Hicks album), 1994
- Duality (Lisa Gerrard and Pieter Bourke album), 1998
- Duality (Set It Off album), 2014
- Duality (Ra album), 2005
- Duality (mixtape), by Captain Murphy, 2012
- Duality (Luna Li album), 2022
- Duality (Lindsey Stirling album), 2024
- Duality, a 2009 album by Darker Half
- Duality, a 2020 album by Duke Dumont
- Duality, a 2018 album by Big Scoob
- Duality, a 2002 album by Terje Gewelt

=== Songs ===
- "Duality", a 2014 single from pop rock/punk rock band Set It Off
- "Duality" (song), a 2004 single by metal band Slipknot
- "Duality", a 2007 single from alternative rock/punk band Bayside

== Other ==
- Duality (film), a 2001 Star Wars fan film by Dave Macomber and Mark Thomas
- Duality, a large format audio mixing console by Solid State Logic
- Dual (grammatical number), grammatical number that some languages use in addition to singular and plural

== See also ==
- Double (disambiguation)
- Dual (disambiguation)
- Duality principle (disambiguation)
- List of dualities: philosophy, mathematics, physics and engineering
- Nondualism (philosophy)
- Triality (mathematics)
