= Duo =

Duo may refer to:

== Places ==
- Duo, West Virginia, an unincorporated community and coal town in Greenbrier County, West Virginia
- Duo, Tampere, a shopping centre in Hervanta, Tampere, Finland
- DUO, a twin-tower development in Singapore

== Arts, entertainment and media ==
=== Fictional characters ===
- Duo (Mega Man), a fictional protagonist in the Capcom video game series Mega Man
- Duo Maxwell, a fictional protagonist in the television series Gundam Wing
- Duo, the fictional owl mascot of the language learning website and mobile application Duolingo

=== Films ===
- Duo (2006 film), a Canadian romantic comedy film directed by Richard Ciupka
- Pas de deux (film), a 1969 Canadian film also known as Duo

=== Music ===
- Duet or duo, a musical piece performed by two musicians
- Musical duo, a musical ensemble composed of two musicians

=== Albums ===
- Duo (Kenny Drew and Niels-Henning Ørsted Pedersen album), 1973
- Duo 2, Kenny Drew and Niels-Henning Ørsted Pedersen album, 1974
- Duo (Marilyn Crispell and Gerry Hemingway album), 1992
- Duo (Richard Marx and Matt Scannell album), 2008
- Duo (Merzbow album) box set, 2012
- Duo (Peter Ostroushko and Dean Magraw album), 1991
- Duo (Cedar Walton and David Williams album), 1990
- Duo (Hank Jones and Red Mitchell album), 1987
- In duo, Mina album, 2003

=== Other media ===
- Duo (novel), a novel by Colette
- The Duo, a 2011 South Korean television series
- Comedy duo, also known as a double act

== Computing ==
- Core 2 Duo, a computer processor from manufacturer Intel
- Google Duo, a video chat app made by Google
- iPhone Duo, a foldable smartphone made by Apple
- PowerBook Duo, a laptop computer from computer maker Apple
- Surface Duo, dual-touchscreen Android smartphone manufactured by Microsoft
- Duo Security, a multifactor authentication service now owned by Cisco

== Other uses ==
- Duo Airways, a defunct UK airline
- Duo Interpretation, a speaking event
- TL Ultralight TL-22 Duo, Czech ultralight trike design
- Duo, a clone of Uno (card game)

== See also ==
- Dynamic duo (disambiguation)
- Dual (disambiguation)
- Double (disambiguation)
- Pair (disambiguation)
- Twin (disambiguation)
