= Dua (disambiguation) =

A dua (Arabic: دعاء; also du'a' or duaa) is an Islamic prayer.

Dua, duaa or DUA may also refer to:

== Arts and entertainment ==
- "Duaa" (song), in 2012 film Shanghai
- "Dua", in 2024 film Article 370
- Dua (film), a 2026 film by Blerta Basholli
- Dua, a character in The Gods Themselves, a 1979 novel by Isaac Asimov

== People ==
- Dua (surname), list of people so named
- Dua Lipa (born 1995), English singer
- Dua Saleh (fl. since 1997), Sudanese-American singer and actor
- Kwaku Dua I (c. 1797–1867), king of the Asante Empire, modern-day Ghana

== Political parties ==
- Democrat Union of Africa, an international federation
- Democratic Unionist Association, Northern Ireland
- Democratic Union of Albanians, Montenegro

== Religion ==
- Raising hands in Dua, a gesture during Islam prayer
- Coconut Religion (Vietnamese: Đạo Dừa; 1967–1999)

== Other uses ==
- Distinguished Unit Award, for US school-age military programs
- Duala language, spoken in Cameroon (ISO 636:dua)
- Durant Regional Airport – Eaker Field, Oklahoma, US (IATA:DUA)
- Defence Universities Alliance, a UK government initiative

== See also ==
- DOA (disambiguation)
- Do'a or Do'ah, a musical group founded by Randy Armstrong
- Doer (disambiguation)
- Dooars, Indian floodplains
- Door (disambiguation)
- Dual (disambiguation)
- Duar War
- Duas (disambiguation)
