= Duality principle =

Duality principle or principle of duality may refer to:

- Duality (projective geometry)
- Duality (order theory)
- Duality principle (Boolean algebra)
- Duality principle for sets
- Duality principle (optimization theory)
- Lagrange duality
- Duality principle in functional analysis, used in large sieve method of analytic number theory
- Wave–particle duality

== See also ==
- Duality (mathematics)
- Duality (disambiguation)
- Dual (disambiguation)
- List of dualities
