= System equivalence =

In the systems sciences system equivalence is the behavior of a parameter or component of a system in a way similar to a parameter or component of a different system. Similarity means that mathematically the parameters and components will be indistinguishable from each other. Equivalence can be very useful in understanding how complex systems work.

== Overview ==
Examples of equivalent systems are first- and second-order (in the independent variable) translational, electrical, torsional, fluidic, and caloric systems.

Equivalent systems can be used to change large and expensive mechanical, thermal, and fluid systems into a simple, cheaper electrical system. Then the electrical system can be analyzed to validate that the system dynamics will work as designed. This is a preliminary inexpensive way for engineers to test that their complex system performs the way they are expecting.

This testing is necessary when designing new complex systems that have many components. Businesses do not want to spend millions of dollars on a system that does not perform the way that they were expecting. Using the equivalent system technique, engineers can verify and prove to the business that the system will work. This lowers the risk factor that the business is taking on the project.

The following is a chart of equivalent variables for the different types of systems:

System type	Flow variable	Effort variable	Compliance	Inductance	Resistance
Mechanical	dx/dt	F = force	spring (k)	mass (m)	damper (c)
Electrical	i = current	V = voltage	capacitance (C)	inductance (L)	resistance (R)
Thermal	q_{h} = heat flow rate	∆T = change in temperature	object (C)	inductance (L)	conduction and convection (R)
Fluid	q_{m} = mass flow rate, q_{v} = volume flow rate	p = pressure, h = height	tank (C)	mass (m)	valve or orifice (R)

Flow variable: moves through the system
Effort variable: puts the system into action
Compliance: stores energy as potential
Inductance: stores energy as kinetic
Resistance: dissipates or uses energy

The equivalents shown in the chart are not the only way to form mathematical analogies. In fact there are any number of ways to do this. A common requirement for analysis is that the analogy correctly models energy storage and flow across energy domains. To do this, the equivalences must be compatible. A pair of variables whose product is power (or energy) in one domain must be equivalent to a pair of variables in the other domain whose product is also power (or energy). These are called power conjugate variables. The thermal variables shown in the chart are not power conjugates and thus do not meet this criterion. See mechanical–electrical analogies for more detailed information on this. Even specifying power conjugate variables does not result in a unique analogy and there are at least three analogies of this sort in use. At least one more criterion is needed to uniquely specify the analogy, such as the requirement that impedance is equivalent in all domains as is done in the impedance analogy.

== Examples ==
Mechanical systems
Force $F = -kx = c\frac{dx}{dt} = m\frac{d^2x}{dt^2}$

Electrical systems
Voltage $V = \frac{Q}{C} = R\frac{dQ}{dt} = L\frac{d^2Q}{dt^2}$

All the fundamental variables of these systems have the same functional form.

== Discussion ==
The system equivalence method may be used to describe systems of two types: "vibrational" systems (which are thus described - approximately - by harmonic oscillation) and "translational" systems (which deal with "flows"). These are not mutually exclusive; a system may have features of both. Similarities also exist; the two systems can often be analysed by the methods of Euler, Lagrange and Hamilton, so that in both cases the energy is quadratic in the relevant degree(s) of freedom, provided they are linear.

Vibrational systems are often described by some sort of wave (partial differential) equation, or oscillator (ordinary differential) equation. Furthermore, these sorts of systems follow the capacitor or spring analogy, in the sense that the dominant degree of freedom in the energy is the generalized position. In more physical language, these systems are predominantly characterised by their potential energy. This often works for solids, or (linearized) undulatory systems near equilibrium.

On the other hand, flow systems may be easier described by the hydraulic analogy or the diffusion equation. For example, Ohm's law was said to be inspired by Fourier's law (as well as the work of C.-L. Navier). Other laws include Fick's laws of diffusion and generalized transport problems. The most important idea is the flux, or rate of transfer of some important physical quantity considered (like electric or magnetic fluxes). In these sorts of systems, the energy is dominated by the derivative of the generalized position (generalized velocity). In physics parlance, these systems tend to be kinetic energy-dominated. Field theories, in particular electromagnetism, draw heavily from the hydraulic analogy.

== See also ==
- Capacitor analogy
- Hydraulic analogy
- Analogical models
- For harmonic oscillators, see Universal oscillator equation and Equivalent systems
- Linear time-invariant system
- Resonance
- Q-factor
- Impedance
- Thermal inductance
