= Aharonov =

Aharonov is a surname. Notable people with the surname include:

- Dorit Aharonov (born 1970), Israeli computer scientist
- Yakir Aharonov (born 1932), Israeli physicist

== See also ==
- Aharonov–Bohm effect, quantum mechanical phenomenon
- Aharonov–Casher effect, quantum mechanical phenomenon
