= Hot Toys =

Hong Kong scale model manufacturer

Hot Toys Limited
- Type: Private
- Founded: 2000; 26 years ago
- Headquarters: Kwun Tong, Hong Kong,
- Key people: Howard Chan
- Products: Plastic models, action figures
- Website: hottoys.com.hk

Hot Toys Limited is a Hong Kong production house for designing, developing, and manufacturing highly detailed collectible merchandise to worldwide markets. They are known for their high end 1/6th scale figurines of licensed properties, like Marvel and Star Wars, which must be preordered. Hot Toys collectibles are primarily available to purchase from secondary retailers, like Sideshow.

Established in 2000 in Hong Kong (with its current headquarters in Kwun Tong District), the company initially focused on producing 1:6 scale US Army Special Forces action figures. It then transitioned to production of high-end figures based on media properties, primarily under their Movie Masterpiece Series brand. Their team of artists is led by sculptor Yulli and painter JC Hong.

In 2010, Hot Toys’ one and only official store, Toy Hunters, was recognized as one of the 50 best independent shops in Hong Kong by Time Out Magazine.

== Licensed properties ==
=== Films ===
- 300
- Alien film series
- Alien vs. Predator film series
- Alita: Battle Angel
- Ant-Man
- Ant-Man and the Wasp
- Ant-Man and the Wasp: Quantumania
- Aquaman
- Aquaman and the Lost Kingdom
- Astro Boy
- Avatar
- Avatar: The Way of Water
- Avatar: Fire and Ash
- The Avengers
- Avengers: Age of Ultron
- Avengers: Infinity War
- Avengers: Endgame
- Avengers: Doomsday
- The Amazing Spider-Man
- The Amazing Spider-Man 2
- Back to the Future
- Back to the Future Part II
- Back to the Future Part III
- Ballerina
- Batman
- Batman Returns
- Batman Forever
- Batman & Robin
- Batman Begins
- Batman v Superman: Dawn of Justice
- The Batman
- Beauty and the Beast
- Beetlejuice Beetlejuice
- Birds of Prey
- Black Adam
- Black Panther
- Black Panther: Wakanda Forever
- Black Widow
- Blade trilogy
- Captain America: The First Avenger
- Captain America: The Winter Soldier
- Captain America: Civil War
- Captain America: Brave New World
- Captain Marvel
- Clash of the Titans
- Commando
- The Crow
- The Dark Knight
- The Dark Knight Rises
- Dawn of the Planet of the Apes
- Deadpool
- Deadpool 2
- Deadpool & Wolverine
- Doctor Strange
- Doctor Strange in the Multiverse of Madness
- Edward Scissorhands
- Eternals
- The Expendables
- Fantastic Beasts: The Crimes of Grindelwald
- The Fantastic Four: First Steps
- The Flash
- G.I. Joe: Retaliation
- The Godfather
- Goemon
- Green Lantern
- Guardians of the Galaxy
- Guardians of the Galaxy Vol. 2
- Guardians of the Galaxy Vol. 3
- Hellboy
- Hellboy II: The Golden Army
- It Chapter Two
- Indiana Jones film series
- Indiana Jones and the Dial of Destiny
- Inglourious Basterds
- Inside Out 2
- Iron Man
- Iron Man 2
- Iron Man 3
- James Bond film series
- John Wick: Chapter 2
- John Wick: Chapter 4
- Joker
- Justice League
- Kamui Gaiden
- KPop Demon Hunters
- Lightyear
- Lilo & Stitch
- Maleficent
- Man of Steel
- Mars Attacks!
- Masters of the Universe
- The Matrix
- The Matrix Resurrections
- Morbius
- Pirates of the Caribbean film series
- Planet of the Apes
- Platoon
- Predator film series
- Prey
- Prince of Persia: The Sands of Time
- Rambo film series
- Rango
- Resident Evil film series
- RoboCop film series
- Rocky film series
- Shang-Chi and the Legend of the Ten Rings
- Space Pirate Captain Harlock
- The Spirit
- Spider-Man 3
- Spider-Man: Homecoming
- Spider-Man: Far From Home
- Spider-Man: No Way Home
- Spider-Man: Brand New Day
- Spider-Man: Into the Spider-Verse
- Spider-Man: Across the Spider-Verse
- Sucker Punch
- Suicide Squad
- The Suicide Squad
- Supergirl
- Superman: The Movie
- Superman
- Superman Returns
- Star Wars film series
- Terminator film series
- The Warlords
- The Wolverine
- Thor
- Thor: The Dark World
- Thor: Ragnarok
- Thor: Love and Thunder
- Thunderbolts*
- Tron: Ares
- Tron: Legacy
- Twilight of the Warriors: Walled In
- Venom
- Venom: Let There Be Carnage
- Warriors of Future
- Wonder Woman
- Wonder Woman 1984
- X-Men: The Last Stand
- X-Men Origins: Wolverine
- X-Men: First Class
- X-Men: Days of Future Past
- Zack Snyder's Justice League
- Zootopia 2

=== TV series ===
- Ahsoka
- Agents of S.H.I.E.L.D.
- Andor
- Arcane
- Batman
- The Book of Boba Fett
- Daredevil
- The Falcon and the Winter Soldier
- The Flash
- Hawkeye
- I Am Groot
- Kamen Rider
- Kamen Rider Amazon
- Kamen Rider Black
- Kamen Rider V3
- Kamen Rider Black Sun
- The Last of Us
- Loki
- The Mandalorian
- Maul - Shadow Lord
- Moon Knight
- One Piece
- Obi-Wan Kenobi
- Peacemaker
- Prison Break
- The Punisher: One Last Kill
- Rebels
- She-Hulk: Attorney at Law
- Spider-Man
- Squid Game
- The Bad Batch
- The Clone Wars
- WandaVision
- Wednesday
- What If...?
- X-Men '97
- Your Friendly Neighborhood Spider-Man

=== Cartoons ===
- Disney Characters

=== Video games ===
- Batman: Arkham
- Resident Evil
- Assassin's Creed
- Death Stranding 2: On the Beach
- Cyberpunk 2077
- Metal Gear Solid
- Sonic the Hedgehog
- Spider-Man
- Spider-Man 2
- Spider-Man: Miles Morales
- Halo game series
- League of Legends game series

=== Anime/manga ===
- Appleseed Ex Machina
- Astro Boy
- Battle Royale II
- Black Jack
- City Hunter
- Dandadan
- Delicious in Dungeon
- Frieren
- Mobile Suit Gundam – Aznable

=== Comic Masterpiece Series ===
- Friend
- City Hunter
- The Dark Knight Returns

=== Celebrities ===
- Christian Bale
- Marlon Brando
- James Dean
- Michael Jackson
- Leslie Cheung
- Namson Lau
- Wong Ka Kui
- 50 Cent
- Bruce Lee
- Stan Lee
- Kevin Feige
- Eminem
- Snoop Dogg
- Al Pacino

== In popular culture ==
Hot Toys action figures have been used in stop motion videos, specifically by Canadian director Patrick Boivin and Hong Kong director Derek Kwok.

== See also ==
- Funko
