= Duas =

Duas may refer to:

- Duas Barras, Rio de Janeiro, Brazil
- Duas Igrejas (Paredes), Paredes, Porto, Portugal

== See also ==
- Dua (disambiguation)
- Dual (disambiguation)
