= Duality (mechanical engineering) =

In mechanical engineering, many terms are associated into pairs called duals. A dual of a relationship is formed by interchanging force (stress) and deformation (strain) in an expression.

Here is a partial list of mechanical dualities:

- force — deformation
- stress — strain
- stiffness method — flexibility method

== Examples ==
=== Constitutive relation ===
- stress and strain (Hooke's law.)

$$\sigma = E \varepsilon \iff \varepsilon = \frac{1}{E} \sigma \,$$

== See also ==
- Duality (electrical circuits)
- Hydraulic analogy
- List of dualities
- Mechanical–electrical analogies
- Series and parallel springs
