= Series and parallel springs =

Ways of coupling springs in mechanics

In mechanics, two or more springs are said to be in series when they are connected end-to-end or point to point, and they are said to be in parallel when they are connected side-by-side; in both cases, so as to act as a single spring:

Series	and	Parallel
	and

More generally, two or more springs are in series when any external stress applied to the ensemble gets applied to each spring without change of magnitude, and the amount of strain (deformation) of the ensemble is the sum of the strains of the individual springs. Conversely, they are said to be in parallel if the strain of the ensemble is their common strain, and the stress of the ensemble is the sum of their stresses.

Any combination of Hookean (linear-response) springs in series or parallel behaves like a single Hookean spring. The formulas for combining their physical attributes are analogous to those that apply to capacitors connected in series or parallel in an electrical circuit.

== Formulas ==
=== Equivalent spring ===
The following table gives formulas for the spring that is equivalent to an ensemble (or system) of two springs, in series or in parallel, whose spring constants are $k_1$ and $k_2$. (The compliance $c$ of a spring is the reciprocal $1/k$ of its spring constant.)

Quantity	In Series	In Parallel
Equivalent spring constant	$\frac{1}{k_\mathrm{eq}} = \frac{1}{k_1} + \frac{1}{k_2}$	$k_\mathrm{eq} = k_1 + k_2$
Equivalent compliance	$c_\mathrm{eq} = c_1 + c_2$	$\frac{1}{c_\mathrm{eq}} = \frac{1}{c_1} + \frac{1}{c_2}$
Deflection (elongation)	$x_\mathrm{eq} = x_1 + x_2$	$x_\mathrm{eq} = x_1 = x_2$
Force	$F_\mathrm{eq} = F_1 = F_2$	$F_\mathrm{eq} = F_1 + F_2$
Stored energy	$E_\mathrm{eq} = E_1 + E_2$	$E_\mathrm{eq} = E_1 + E_2$

== Partition formulas ==
Quantity	In Series	In Parallel
Deflection (elongation)	$\frac{x_1}{x_2} = \frac{k_2}{k_1} = \frac{c_1}{c_2}$	$x_1 = x_2 \,$
Force	$F_1 = F_2 \,$	$\frac{F_1}{F_2} = \frac{k_1}{k_2} = \frac{c_2}{c_1}$
Stored energy	$\frac{E_1}{E_2} = \frac{k_2}{k_1} = \frac{c_1}{c_2}$	$\frac{E_1}{E_2} = \frac{k_1}{k_2} = \frac{c_2}{c_1}$

=== Derivations of spring formulas (equivalent spring constant) ===
Equivalent Spring Constant (Series)
When putting two springs in their equilibrium positions in series attached at the end to a block and then displacing it from that equilibrium, each of the springs will experience corresponding displacements x_{1} and x_{2} for a total displacement of x_{1} + x_{2}. We will be looking for an equation for the force on the block that looks like:

$$F_b = -k_\mathrm{eq} (x_1+x_2) .\,$$

The force that each spring experiences will have to be same since otherwise, the springs would buckle. Moreover, this force will be the same as F_{b}. This means that

$$F_1 = -k_1 x_1= F_2=-k_2 x_2 = F_b.\,$$

Working in terms of the absolute values, we can solve for $x_1\,$ and $x_2\,$:

$$x_1 ~=~ \frac{F_1}{k_1}\,,\qquad x_2 ~=~ \frac{F_2}{k_2}$$,

and similarly,

$$x_1 ~+~ x_2 ~=~ \frac{F_b}{k_\mathrm{eq}}$$.

Substituting $x_1\,$ and $x_2\,$ into the latter equation, we find

$$\frac{F_1}{k_1} ~+~ \frac{F_2}{k_2}  ~=~  \frac{F_b}{k_\mathrm{eq}}$$.

Now remembering that $F_1 ~=~ F_2 ~=~ F_b$, we arrive at

$$\frac{1}{k_\mathrm{eq}} = \frac{1}{k_1} + \frac{1}{k_2}. \,$$

Equivalent Spring Constant (Parallel)
Both springs are touching the block in this case, and whatever distance spring 1 is compressed has to be the same amount spring 2 is compressed. The force on the block is then:

$F_b \,$	$= F_1 + F_2 \,$
	$= -k_1 x - k_2 x \,$

So the force on the block is

$$F_b = - (k_1 + k_2) x. \,$$

Which is how we can define the equivalent spring constant as

$$k_\mathrm{eq} = k_1 + k_2 .  \,$$

Compressed Distance
In the case where two springs are in parallel it is immediate that: $x_1 = x_2 \,$ $F_1 = -k_1 x_1$ and $F_2 = -k_2 x_2. \,$	In the case where two springs are in series, the force of the springs on each other are equal: $F_1 = F_2 \,$ $-k_1 x_1 = -k_2 x_2. \,$ From this we get a relationship between the compressed distances for the in series case: $$\frac{x_1}{x_2} = \frac{k_2}{k_1}. \,$$

Energy Stored
For the series case, the ratio of energy stored in springs is:

$$\frac{E_1}{E_2} = \frac{\frac{1}{2} k_1 x_1^2}{\frac{1}{2}k_2 x_2^2}, \,$$

but there is a relationship between x_{1} and x_{2} derived earlier, so we can plug that in:

$$\frac{E_1}{E_2} = \frac{k_1}{k_2} \left(\frac{k_2}{k_1}\right)^2 = \frac{k_2}{k_1} . \,$$

For the parallel case,

$$\frac{E_1}{E_2} = \frac{\frac{1}{2} k_1 x^2}{\frac{1}{2}k_2 x^2} \,$$

because the compressed distance of the springs is the same, this simplifies to

$$\frac{E_1}{E_2} = \frac{k_1}{k_2}. \,$$

GATO Ignace notes about spring associations

== See also ==
- Truss
- Duality (mechanical engineering)
