= Num (god) =

Among the Nenets people of Siberia, the male Num was the sky god, the good creator of earth and the high god of the Nenets. Num is one of two demiurges, or supreme gods. The Nenets believed earth and all living things were created by the god Num and every heavenly sphere is ruled by one son of the Num god. Nga was his malevolent son.

According to one story, the world threatened to collapse on itself. To try to halt this cataclysm a shaman sought the advice of Num. The shaman was advised to travel below the earth, to Nga's domain and call upon him. The shaman did as told and was wed with Nga's daughter. After that point he began to support the world in his hand and became known as "The Old Man of the Earth."

In another myth, Num and Nga create the world, collaborating and also competing with each other — the myth is an example of dualistic cosmology.

The word Num means heaven in Nenets.

== See also ==
- Nga (god)
- Pole worship

== Sources ==
- Vértes, Edit (1990). Szibériai nyelvrokonaink hitvilága (in Hungarian). Budapest: Tankönyvkiadó. ISBN 963-18-2603-1. The title means: “Belief systems of our language relatives in Siberia”.
