= Dua (surname) =

Dua is a surname used by Punjabi Hindus and Sikhs of the Khatri caste.

Notable people with the surname, who may or may not be affiliated to the clan, include:

== T-Series family ==
- Bhushan Kumar (born 1977), Indian producer and businessman
- Gulshan Kumar (1951–1997), Indian producer and businessman
- Khushalii Kumar (born 1990), Indian actress and fashion designer
- Krishan Kumar, Indian actor and producer
- Tulsi Kumar (born 1986), Indian singer and actress

== Other people ==
- Harminder Dua, British-Indian doctor and researcher
- H. K. Dua (born 1937), Indian journalist and diplomat
- Khushalii Kumar (born 1988), Indian actress
- Krishan Kumar Dua, Indian actor and producer
- Mallika Dua (born 1989), Indian stand-up comedian
- Narendra Dua (born 1939), Indian cricketer
- Rahul Dua, Indian stand-up comedian
- Sana Dua (born 1993), Indian lawyer
- Sanjeev Dua (born 1965), Indian cricket umpire
- Satish Dua, Indian general
- Vera Dua (born 1952), Flemish politician
- Vinod Dua (1954–2021), Indian journalist

== See also ==
- Dua (disambiguation)
