= Nga (god) =

Samoyed god of death

Among the Nenets people of Siberia, Nga was the god of death, as well as one of two demiurges, or supreme gods.

According to one story, the world threatened to collapse on itself. To try to halt this cataclysm a shaman sought the advice of the other demiurge, Num. The shaman was advised to travel below the earth, to Nga's domain and call upon him. The shaman did as told and was wed with Nga's daughter. After that point he began to support the world in his hand and became known as "The Old Man of the Earth." In another myth, Num and Nga create the world, collaborating and also competing with each other — the myth is an example of dualistic cosmology.

== See also ==
- Ceremonial pole

== Sources ==
- Vértes, Edit (1990). Szibériai nyelvrokonaink hitvilága (in Hungarian). Budapest: Tankönyvkiadó. ISBN 963-18-2603-1. The title means: “Belief systems of our language relatives in Siberia”.
