= Aerochute International =

Australian aircraft manufacturer

Aerochute International Pty. Ltd
- Company type: Privately held company
- Industry: Aerospace
- Founded: 1989
- Founder: Stephen Conte
- Headquarters: Australia
- Products: Kit aircraft, powered parachutes
- Website: aerochute.com.au

Aerochute International Pty. Ltd is an Australian aircraft manufacturer founded in 1989 by Stephen Conte and based in Coburg North, Victoria. The company specializes in the design and manufacture of powered parachutes in the form of kits for amateur construction for the European Fédération Aéronautique Internationale microlight category. The aircraft are also approved by the Australian Civil Aviation Safety Authority.

The company introduced its single seat model, the Aerochute International Hummerchute in 1989 and the two-seat Aerochute International Dual in 1992.

Aerochute is also an approved powered parachute flight training school, with locations in Melbourne and Perth.

== Aircraft ==
Summary of aircraft built by Aerochute International
Model name	First flight	Number built	Type
Aerochute International Hummerchute	1989		Single seat powered parachute
Aerochute International Dual	1992		Two seat powered parachute
