= Dualist (album) =

Album by Taken by Cars

Studio album by Taken by Cars
- Released: 15 April 2011
- Genre: Indie rock, alternative dance
- Length: 43:09
- Label: Party Bear
- Producer: Miguel Alcaraz

Taken by Cars chronology
Endings of a New Kind (2008)	Dualist (2011)

Dualist is the second studio album by the Filipino indie rock band Taken by Cars, released in 2011 by Party Bear Records.

Professional ratings
Review scores
Source	Rating
Pulp Magazine Philippines	Favourable
Splintr.com	Favourable
Music Is Amazing	Favourable
Philcharts	Favourable

== Reception ==
Dualist was more favorably received by both critics and fans compared to their first album Endings of A New Kind, which received moderate to positive reviews.

== Track listing ==
1. "This is Our City" – 3:35
2. "Unidentified" – 2:52
3. "34" – 3:55
4. "Quarter to Three" – 3:27
5. "Matter of Fact" – 5:03
6. "Considerate" – 4:05
7. "Autopilot" – 3:11
8. "Thrones: Indifference" – 3:29
9. "Thrones: Equals" – 4:16
10. "Intermission" – 6:11
11. "Sea Bass" – 3:57
