= List of dualities =

== Mathematics ==
In mathematics, a duality, generally speaking, translates concepts, theorems or mathematical structures into other concepts, theorems or structures, in a one-to-one fashion, often (but not always) by means of an involution operation: if the dual of A is B, then the dual of B is A.

- Alexander duality
- Alvis–Curtis duality
- Artin–Verdier duality
- Beta-dual space
- Coherent duality
- Conjugate hyperbola
- De Groot dual
- Dual abelian variety
- Dual basis in a field extension
- Dual bundle
- Dual curve
- Dual (category theory)
- Dual graph
- Dual group
- Dual object
- Dual pair
- Dual polygon
- Dual polyhedron
- Dual problem
- Dual representation
- Dual q-Hahn polynomials
- Dual q-Krawtchouk polynomials
- Dual space
- Dual topology
- Dual wavelet
- Duality (optimization)
- Duality (order theory)
- Duality of stereotype spaces
- Duality (projective geometry)
- Duality theory for distributive lattices
- Dualizing complex
- Dualizing sheaf
- Eckmann–Hilton duality
- Esakia duality
- Fenchel's duality theorem
- Grothendieck local duality
- Hodge dual
- Isbell duality
- Jónsson–Tarski duality
- Lagrange duality
- Langlands dual
- Lefschetz duality
- Local Tate duality
- Opposite category
- Poincaré duality
  - Twisted Poincaré duality
- Poitou–Tate duality
- Pontryagin duality
- S-duality (homotopy theory)
- Schur–Weyl duality
- Series-parallel duality
- Serre duality
- Spanier–Whitehead duality
- Stone's duality
- Tannaka–Krein duality
- Verdier duality

== Philosophy and religion ==
- Dualism (philosophy of mind)
- Dualistic cosmology
- Epistemological dualism
- Soul dualism
- Yin and yang

== Engineering ==
- Duality (electrical circuits)
- Duality (mechanical engineering)
- Observability/Controllability in control theory

== Physics ==
- Babinet's principle (electromagnetism)
- Complementarity (physics)
- Dual resonance model
- Duality (electricity and magnetism)
- Englert–Greenberger duality relation
- Holographic duality
  - AdS/CFT correspondence
- Kramers–Wannier duality
- Mirror symmetry
  - 3D mirror symmetry
- Montonen–Olive duality
- Mysterious duality (M-theory)
- Seiberg duality
- String duality
  - S-duality
  - T-duality
  - U-duality
- Wave–particle duality

== Economics and finance ==
- Convex duality

== See also ==
- Mechanical–electrical analogies
