= DOA =

DOA commonly refers to:

- Dead on arrival
- Dead or alive

DOA, doa, or Doa may also refer to:

== Films ==
- D.O.A. (1950 film), a film noir
- D.O.A. (1988 film), a remake of the 1950 film
- D.O.A. (2022 film), an American film noir
- D.O.A.: A Rite of Passage (1980 film), a documentary on the genesis of punk rock
- DOA: Dead or Alive, a 2006 film based on the video game series produced by Tecmo
- DOA: Death of Amar, a 2014 film

== Television ==
- D.O.A., a 2010 television comedy starring Kris Marshall
- "D.O.A.", a 2004 episode of the American drama series Tru Calling
- "D.O.A.", a 2007 episode of the American drama series Crossing Jordan
- "DOA", a 2014 episode of the American drama series Unforgettable

== Music ==
- D.O.A. (band), a Vancouver punk band
- doa (Japanese band), a rock band from Japan
- Dogs on Acid (also known as DOA), an electronic music website
- Do'a or Do'ah, a musical group founded by Randy Armstrong

=== Albums ===
- DOA (mixtape), a mixtape by Ericdoa
- D.o.A: The Third and Final Report of Throbbing Gristle, an album by Throbbing Gristle
- D.O.A., a 1989 compilation album by Bloodrock
- Dead on Arrival:tu maldita madre, a live/compilation album by Charged GBH
- The D.O.A Tape, an album by rapper Kay Flock

=== Songs ===
- "D.O.A." (song), a song by Bloodrock
- "DOA" (Foo Fighters song), a song by Foo Fighters
- "D.O.A. (Death of Auto-Tune)", a song by Jay-Z
- "D.O.A.", a song by Brotha Lynch Hung from their album Dinner and a Movie
- "D.O.A.", a song by Coroner from No More Color
- "D.O.A.", a song by Dead Moon from 13 Off My Hook
- "D.O.A", a song by Diablo from Mimic47
- "D.O.A", a song by The Haunted from One Kill Wonder
- "D.O.A.", a song by Lil Wayne from No Ceilings
- "D.O.A.", a song by Loverboy from the album Loverboy
- "D.O.A.", a song by Manilla Road from The Courts of Chaos (album)
- "D.O.A.", a song by Van Halen from Van Halen II
- "DOA", a song by Rich Brian from the EP 1999
- "DOA", a song by I Prevail from Trauma
  - "DOA", a remix by I Prevail and Joyner Lucas
- "D.O.A. (Drunk on Arrival)", a song by Johnny Paycheck
- "D.O.A.", a song from the musical The Lightning Thief
- "DOA", a song by Kay Flock and Set Da Trend
- "DOA", a song by Sawano Hiroyuki, sung by Aimee Blackschleger for the anime Attack on Titan
- "D.O.A.", a song by Jay Reatard from Matador Singles '08
- "D.O.A.", a song by Havok from Time is Up

== Places ==
- Doa District, in Mozambique

== Other uses ==
- DOA a gang located in Bronx, New York also known as Sev Side
- Doa (moth)
- Dead or Alive (series), a video game series produced by Tecmo and developed by Team Ninja
- Department of Archaeology, Nepal
- Diamond open access, the practice of making scholarly publications openly available at no charge to readers or authors
- Dioctyl adipate, an ester of n-octanol and adipic acid, to form a plasticizer oil
- Direction of arrival
- Disciples of Apocalypse, a biker-themed professional wrestling stable
- Doa (commentator), stage name of esports commentator Erik Lonnquist
- Dowagiac station, Amtrak station in Michigan, having DOA station code

== See also ==
- "DOA for a Day", a 2008 episode of the American drama series CSI: NY
- Dua (disambiguation)
