= Thermal inductance =

Phenomenon inducing change in convection current within fluid

Thermal inductance refers to the phenomenon wherein a thermal change of an object surrounded by a fluid will induce a change in convection currents within that fluid, thus inducing a change in the kinetic energy of the fluid. It is considered the thermal analogue to electrical inductance in system equivalence modeling; its unit is the thermal henry.

Thus far, few studies have reported on the inductive phenomenon in the heat-transfer behaviour of a system. In 1946, Bosworth demonstrated that heat flow can have an inductive nature through experiments with a fluidic system. He claimed that the measured transient behaviour of the temperature change cannot be explained by merely the combination of the thermal resistance and the thermal capacitance. Bosworth later extended the experiments to study the thermal mutual inductance; however, he did not report on the thermal inductance in a heat-transfer system with the exception of a fluid flow.

== Recent studies ==
In 2013, Ye et al. have a publication of "Thermal Transient Effect and Improved Junction Temperature Measurement Method in High Voltage Light-Emitting Diodes". In their experiments, a high voltage LED chip was directly attached to a silicon substrate with thin thermal interface material (TIM). The temperature sensors were fabricated using standard silicon processing technologies which were calibrated ranging from 30 °C to 150 °C. The thickness of the chip and TIM were 153μm and 59μm, respectively. Thus the sensors were very close to the p-n junction. The silicon substrate was positioned and vacuumed on a cumbersome thermal plate with an accurate temperature controller in an enclosure. The experimenters applied step-up/step-down currents and measured the characteristics between temperature and forward voltage after 100 ms. In this work, the 'recovery time' is defined as the interval from the start of power change to the time at which the temperature became again equal to the initial temperature value. The results show that the junction temperature of LED decreases significantly and immediately (more than 10 °C) when a current from 100 μA to 15 mA is applied. Then, the junction temperature gradually increases. After a recovery time of ~100 ms, the junction temperature reaches the initial value. At the steady state of 15 mA, the applied high current is instantly reduced through a step-down mode to 100 μA. The measured junction temperature increases by 4 °C within 0.1 ms. The sensor temperature simultaneously shows a temperature increase of 2 °C. Subsequently, the junction temperature gradually decreases. After a recovery time of ~100 ms, the junction temperature decrease to their initial values. Then the junction temperature continues to decrease until the system achieves the steady state at room temperature. Notably, the junction temperature changes in opposition to the current change in the chips.

In 2016, there was a further investigation on this phenomenon. Instead of a high-voltage LED chip, a GaN-based low-voltage LED chip was also examined in this case. This chip can withstand a wider range of applied currents and facilitate more precise power change for observing the thermal inductive responses. The chip was mounted on a lead frame and encapsulated with silicone. The chip package was soldered to a metal core printed circuit board and mounted on a thermal plate with controllable temperatures. The transient junction temperature of the LED chip as a function of time was measured with the applied current as different step down functions. They calculated that the junction temperature is equal to 36.2 °C at 350 mA in this situation. The results are consistent with the previous thermal inductive measurement in the GaN-based high-voltage LED chip. As expected, the junction temperatures immediately rise and gradually decrease as the currents are stepped down. And the recovery time is slower for the system with a larger step level decrease. They prove that a rapid changing power through the GaN-based LEDs induces a proportional temperature change, which is opposed to the temperature change expected from the power input. This phenomenon is referred as thermal inductance in the report. The thermal inductive properties could be related to the thermoelectric effect, especially the transient thermoelectric effect. However, rather than considering the specified structure of thermoelectric devices, it is considered that the thermal inductance that occurs in GaN devices with a p–n junction. With the combination of the thermal resistance, the thermal capacitance, and the thermal inductance, it is expected that their assumption can promote the thermal analysis of high-frequency GaN devices. In addition, it is expected that thermal inductance phenomena exist more widely exist in nonhomogeneous materials and in the field of thermal analysis under energy changes in very short duration.

In 2019, an experiment was carried out in which a thermal oscillation was achieved without any external work being done. The device was composed of a Peltier element and an electric inductance switched in series. It was shown that the time derivative of the heat current is proportional to the negative temperature difference across the device, in analogy to an electric inductor where the time derivative of the electric current is proportional to the negative voltage difference. The resulting "thermal self-inductance" allowing for this oscillatory behavior, with the considered objects always being in thermal quasi-equilibrium, was then expressed as a function of electric inductance, Seebeck coefficient of the used thermoelectric material and the operating temperature, and a differential equation was given for the oscillating thermal "LCR" current in the supplementary information section of the publication. Although the reported thermal oscillation was highly damped and the resulting temperature oscillation around the thermal bath temperature was comparably small, the experiment seems to be a valid proof of concept for a working thermal inductance.
