= Taken by Cars =

Filipino indie rock band

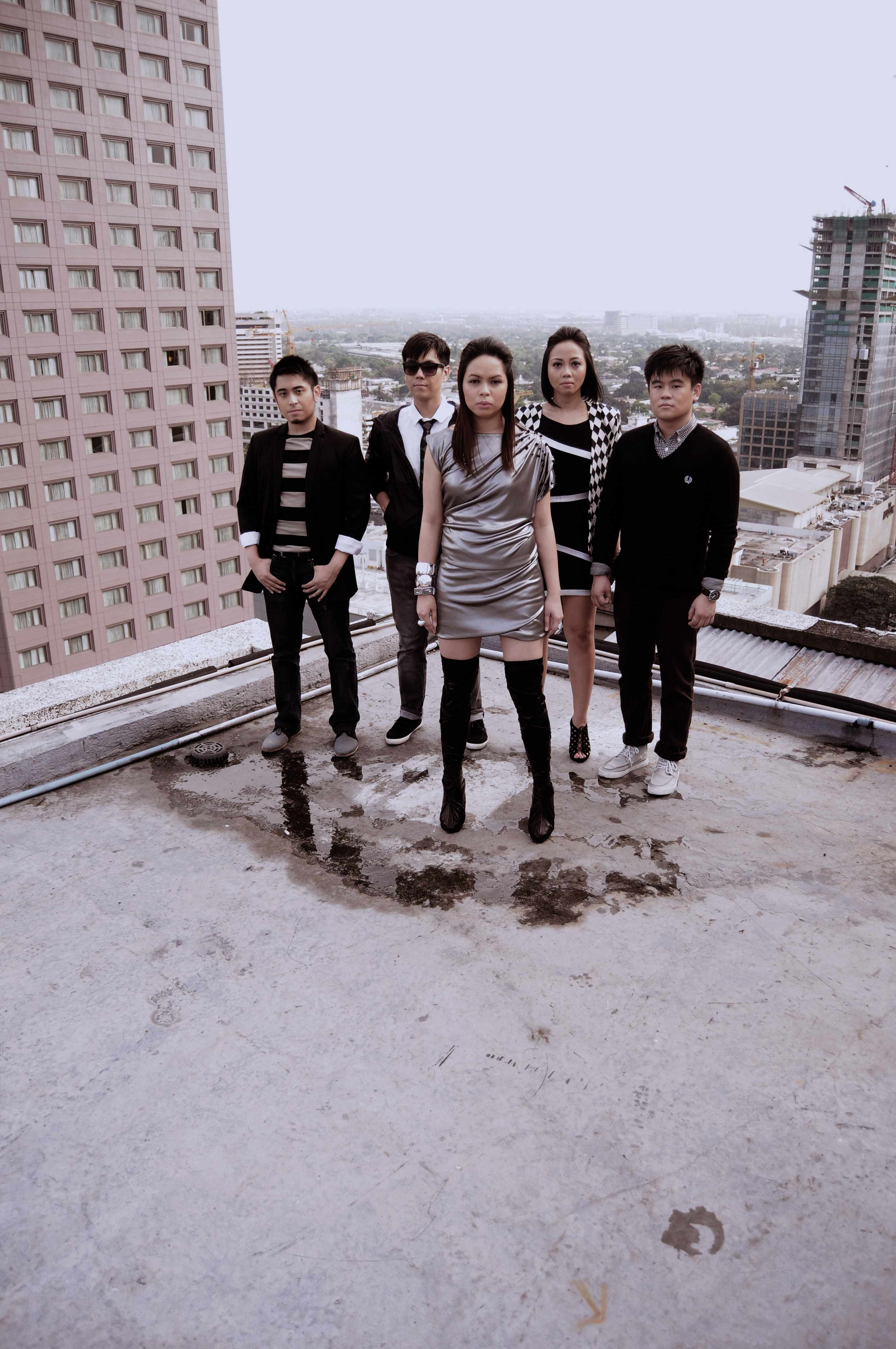
- Taken by Cars

Background information
- Origin: Manila, Philippines Los Angeles, United States
- Genres: Indie rock, post-punk revival, alternative dance
- Years active: 2006–present
- Labels: Party Bear Records; Warner Music Philippines
- Members: Sarah Marco; Isa Garcia; Bryce Zialcita; Siopao Chua; Bryan Kong
- Past members: Benny Yap
- Website: Taken by Cars on MySpace

Taken by Cars, usually referred to as TbC, is a Filipino indie rock band composed of Sarah Marco on vocals, Bryce Zialcita on lead guitar, Derek "Siopao" Chua on rhythm guitar, Isa Garcia on bass guitar, and Bryan Kong on drums and sampler. They describe their sound as a mixture of electro, shoegazing, and new wave.

== History ==
=== Formation (1998–2008) ===
Zialcita, Chua, Yap, and Kong, who have been friends since elementary school, formed a rock band in 1998 when they were high school sophomores. In an interview with Philippine Daily Inquirer, Zialcita said that their only goal was to play gigs in saGuijo, a café in Makati, Philippines, which caters to indie rock enthusiasts. They performed during their high school and college days under different names like "Kung Fu Benny", "Mexican Rice Bowl", and "Morning Wood" until finally deciding on the name "Taken by Cars" because of its association with the concept of movement and that they "listened to a bulk of their music in their cars." They also tried out several music genres before settling into its "classic rock-modern indie vibe" when Marco joined the group in 2006. However, after just one month of gigging in small audiences using original materials, the band took a hiatus due to what they described as "personal reasons". They made most out of this idle time writing and recording new songs in preparation for their return. Without a major record label to promote them, the band uploaded their music on MySpace, where they garnered fans from different parts of the world.

Taken by Cars returned to scene in early 2007 and have become notable in Manila's indie rock scene that fans began to compel local radio stations for them to play the band's first single, "A Weeknight Memoir (In High Definition)". In February 2007, the band submitted a demo copy of the single to NU 107, a rock music station in Pasig, Metro Manila, for its segment "In the Raw". Despite its less-than-perfect audio quality, "A Weeknight Memoir (In High Definition)" received heavy radio airplay and has even reached the top spot of NU 107's daily countdown. Their next single, "Uh Oh", also reached number one in the station's charts.

In early 2011, as the band prepares to release their second album, Time Magazine has named Taken by Cars as one of the five new bands to watch for that year.

=== Endings of a New Kind (2008–2011) ===
The band's appeal has gotten noticed by Warner Music Philippines, which signed the group to a distribution deal. Their debut album, Endings of a New Kind, was released in early 2008 under the production of Mong Alcaraz, who is also behind the music of Sandwich and Chicosci. Endings of a New Kind was received warmly by critics and fans. Entertainment writer Diego Rosano P. Mapa reviewed that he "can hear Bloc Party, CSS and New Young Pony Club in their music, but they are doing something that sounds different and refreshing. The drums party like a drum machine, the riffs are shimmering, the basses distorted like an analog keyboard, and Sarah Marco's vocals are gonna rip all the men's boxer shorts to shreds." The album also includes a download card that provides access to remixed versions of its tracks. They also released a mashup version of "Uh Oh" entitled "Uh Oh It's Electro", which was collaborated with house DJ Funk Avy.

=== Dualist (2011–2016) ===
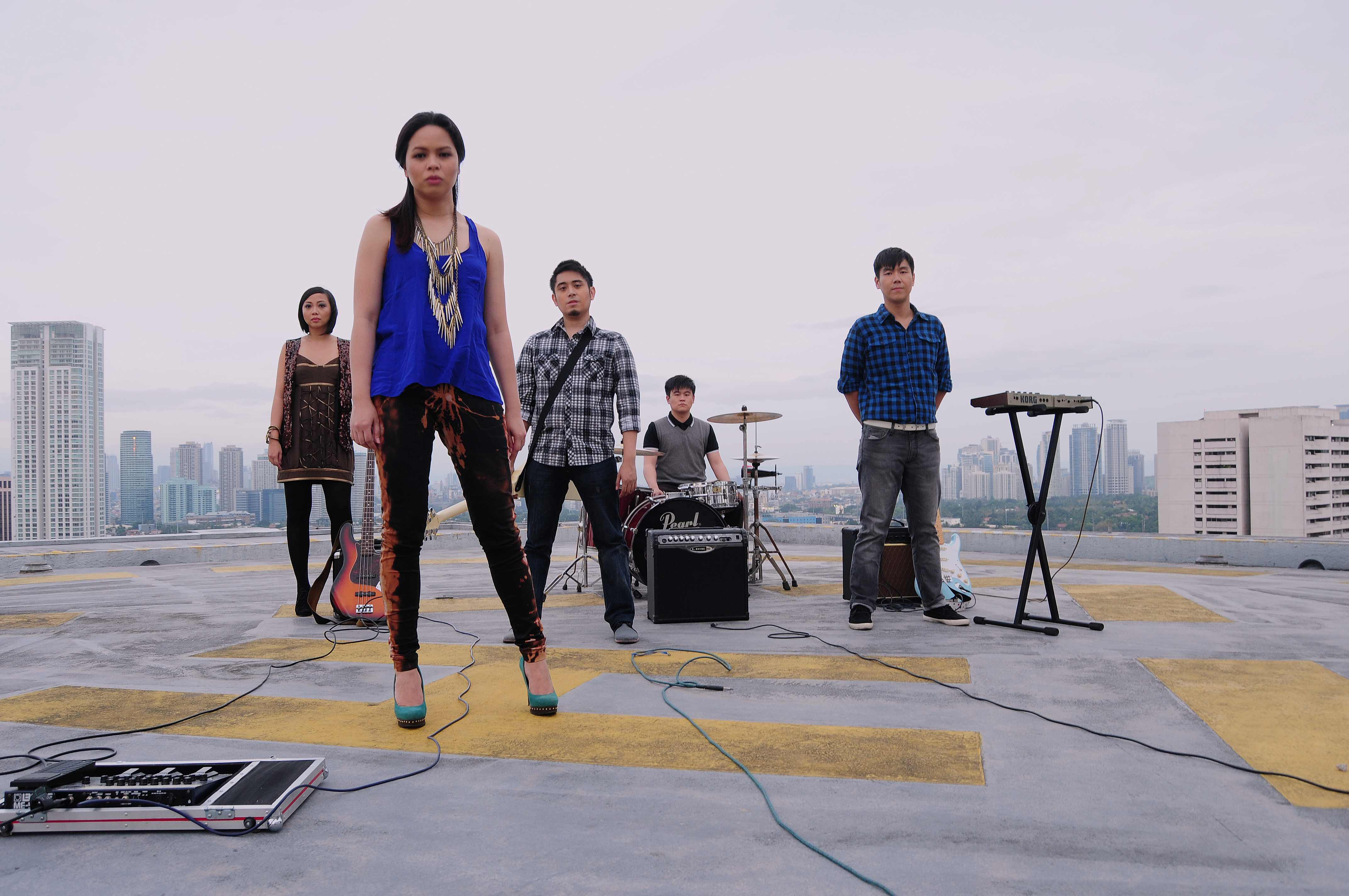
Taken by Cars 2011

The band released their second album, "Dualist", on April 15, 2011. The 11-track "Dualist" features a more personal and mature approach on TbC's signature dance rock sound, which encompasses all the highs and lows the band has gone through over the past three years.

Nearly a year after the release of "Dualist", the band received an invitation to play at South by Southwest in Austin, Texas, United States. They were the first Filipino band to perform at the festival.

=== Plagues (2017–present) ===
Taken by Cars returned to the studio in 2015 and released their third album, "Plagues" digitally in March 2017 and in vinyl in September 2017. It was recorded in Kodama Studios, engineered by Shinji Tanaka and produced by Raymond Marasigan. It was mastered by Grammy Award-winning Mandy Parnell in the UK. The album explores slower tempos, moving into the shoe gaze territory, with certain tracks still nodding at the band's distinct dance-rock anthems.

"If you look at many bands that came up during the New Wave era, for many of them, for their third album, they ditched the old sound in favor of something different yet was arguably their best.

"Plagues" falls into that same category. Taken By Cars doesn't live in their past and strikes into a different sound without sacrificing their identity. It's an introspective album where lyrically, the band is at a crossroads. It revolves around themes of conflict, faith, and life, lead singer Sarah Marco sings of wanting to be free of something (Soothsayer), wanting to belong (All Nighter), wanting to get somewhere (Nomads), and looking to have more faith (Turn of the Tide).

Musically, the band doesn't deviate from its Alt-New Wave roots. "Soothsayer" reminds me of something out of Slowdive's majestic "Souvlaki". "Crowes" takes me back during my New York City days frequenting the rain-swept streets of the Bowery with the music of an early Interpol playing in my head." -- Rick Olivares, ABS-CBN.

Track 01: Floods
Track 02: Turn Of The Tide
Track 03: All Nighter
Track 04: Neon Dreams
Track 05: Soothsayer
Track 06: Plagues
Track 07: Crows
Track 08: Truce
Track 09: Threshold
Track 10: Nomads

== Discography ==
Year	Album title	Record label
2008	Endings of a New Kind	Party Bear Records, Warner Music Philippines
2011	Dualist	Party Bear Records
2017	Plagues	Party Bear Records

Year	Single title	Album
2007	"A Weeknight Memoir (In High Definition)"	Demo/ Endings of a New Kind
2008	"Uh Oh"	Endings of a New Kind
2008	"December 2 Chapter VII"	Endings of a New Kind
2008	"Shapeshifter"	Endings of a New Kind
2009	"Neon Brights"	Endings of a New Kind
2011	"This is Our City"	Dualist
2011	"Unidentified"	Dualist
2016	"Soothsayer"	Plagues
2017	"Turn of the Tide"	Plagues
2018	"Neon Dreams"	Plagues

Year	Music video	Director
2008	"Uh Oh"	Nico Puertollano
2008	"Uh Oh It's Electro"	Pancho Esguerra
2008	"December 2 Chapter VII"	Pancho Esguerra
2008	"Shapeshifter"	Quark Henares
2009	"Neon Brights"	Wincy Aquino Ong
2011	"This is Our City"	Quark Henares
2011	"Unidentified"	RA Rivera
2017	"Turn of the Tide"	King Palisoc
2018	"Neon Dreams"	Caloy Soliongco

== Awards and nominations ==
Year	Award giving body	Category	Nominated work	Results
2008	NU Rock Awards	Album of the Year	"Endings of a New Kind"	Nominated
2008	NU Rock Awards	Best New Artist	—N/a	Nominated
2008	NU Rock Awards	Bassist of the Year	(for Benny Yap)	Nominated
2008	NU Rock Awards	Drummer of the Year	(for Bryan Kong)	Nominated
2008	NU Rock Awards	Producer of the Year	with Mong Alcaraz for "Endings of a New Kind"	Nominated
2008	Junksounds 2008 Regional Music Awards	Album of the Year	"Endings of a New Kind"	Won
2008	Junksounds 2008 Regional Music Awards	Biggest Star Power	—N/a	2nd Runner-up
2009	AVIMA (Asia Voice Independent Music Awards)	Best Dance Act	—N/a	Nominated
2009	AVIMA (Asia Voice Independent Music Awards)	Most Mind Blowing Music Video	"December 2 Chapter VII"	Nominated
2009	AVIMA (Asia Voice Independent Music Awards)	Best Overall Female Vocalist	(for Sarah Marco)	Nominated
2009	MYX Music Awards	Favorite New Artist	—N/a	Nominated
