= Dichotomy =

Partition into two separate parts

In this image, the universal set U (the entire rectangle) is dichotomized into the two sets A (in pink) and its complement A^{c} (in grey).

A dichotomy (/daɪˈkɒtəmi/) is a partition of a whole (or a set) into two parts (subsets). In other words, this couple of parts must be

- jointly exhaustive: everything must belong to one part or the other, and
- mutually exclusive: nothing can belong simultaneously to both parts.

If there is a concept A, and it is split into parts B and not-B, then the parts form a dichotomy: they are mutually exclusive, since no part of B is contained in not-B and vice versa, and they are jointly exhaustive, since they cover all of A, and together again give A.

Such a partition is also frequently called a bipartition. The two parts thus formed are complements. In logic, the partitions are opposites if there exists a proposition such that it holds over one and not the other. Treating continuous variables or multicategorical variables as binary variables is called dichotomization. The discretization error inherent in dichotomization is temporarily ignored for modeling purposes.

== Etymology ==
The term dichotomy is from the Greek: διχοτομία dichotomía "dividing in two" from δίχα dícha "in two, asunder" and τομή tomḗ "a cutting, incision".

== Usage and examples ==
- In set theory, a dichotomous relation R is such that either aRb, bRa, but not both.
- A false dichotomy is an informal fallacy consisting of a supposed dichotomy which fails one or both of the conditions: it is not jointly exhaustive and/or not mutually exclusive. In its most common form, two entities are presented as if they are exhaustive, when in fact other alternatives are possible. In some cases, they may be presented as if they are mutually exclusive although there is a broad middle ground (see also undistributed middle).
- One type of dichotomy is dichotomous classification – classifying objects by recursively splitting them into two groups. As Lewis Carroll explains, "After dividing a Class, by the Process of Dichotomy, into two smaller Classes, we may sub-divide each of these into two still smaller Classes; and this Process may be repeated over and over again, the number of Classes being doubled at each repetition. For example, we may divide "books" into "old" and "new" (i.e. "not-old"): we may then sub-divide each of these into "English" and "foreign" (i.e. "not-English"), thus getting four Classes."
- In statistics, dichotomous data may only exist at first two levels of measurement, namely at the nominal level of measurement (such as "British" vs "American" when measuring nationality) and at the ordinal level of measurement (such as "tall" vs "short", when measuring height). A variable measured dichotomously is called a dummy variable.
- In computer science, more specifically in programming-language engineering, dichotomies are fundamental dualities in a language's design. For instance, C++ has a dichotomy in its memory model (heap versus stack), whereas Java has a dichotomy in its type system (references versus primitive data types).
- In astronomy dichotomy is when the Moon or an inferior planet is exactly half-lit as viewed from Earth. For the Moon, this occurs slightly before one quarter Moon orbit and slightly after the third quarter of the Moon's orbit at 89.85° and 270.15°, respectively. (This is not to be confused with quadrature which is when the Sun-Earth-Moon/superior planet angle is 90°.)
- In botany, branching may be dichotomous or axillary. In dichotomous branching, the branches form as a result of an equal division of a terminal bud (i.e., a bud formed at the apex of a stem) into two equal branches. This also applies to root systems as well.

== See also ==
- The dictionary definition of dichotomy at Wiktionary
- Binary opposition
- Bipartite (disambiguation)
- Class (set theory)
- Dichotomy paradox
- Dilemma
- Dualism
- Law of excluded middle, which in logic asserts the existence of a dichotomy
- Taxonomy
- Trichotomy (disambiguation)
