= Dynamic duo =

Dynamic duo may refer to:

== Arts, entertainment, and media ==
=== Music ===
- Dúo Dinámico (Spanish for Dynamic Duo), a Spanish musical duo formed in 1958 and one of the main precursors of pop music in Spain
- Dynamic Duo (South Korean duo), a South Korean hip-hop duo
- Dynamic Duo (Conway Twitty and Loretta Lynn album), album by American country music duo Conway Twitty & Loretta Lynn
- Jimmy & Wes: The Dynamic Duo, a 1966 album

=== Other uses in arts, entertainment, and media ===
- The collective term for the DC Comics superhero partners Batman and Robin
- Dynamic Duo (film), an upcoming animated DC Comics film
- The Dynamic Duo (TV series), a South Korean television show
- "Dynamic Duo", a song by Lil Yachty and Tee Grizzley from the former's 2021 mixtape Michigan Boy Boat
- MasterChef: Dynamic Duos, the 15th season of FOX's culinary reality competition MasterChef

== Sports ==
- Dynamic Duo (professional wrestling), a common name for a series of professional wrestling tag teams during the 1980s and 1990s
