= Aerochute International Dual =

Australian powered patrachute

Dual

General information
- Type: Powered parachute
- National origin: Australia
- Manufacturer: Aerochute International
- Status: In production (2015)

History
- Introduction date: 1992

The Aerochute International Dual, (formerly called the Two Seater) is an Australian powered parachute designed and produced by Aerochute International of Coburg North, Victoria. The aircraft is supplied as a kit for amateur construction.

== Design and development ==
The Dual was designed to comply with the Fédération Aéronautique Internationale microlight category, including the category's maximum gross weight of 450 kg (992 lb). The aircraft has a maximum gross weight of 300 kg (661 lb). It features a 34 m^{2} (370 sq ft) Ram Air brand parachute-style wing made from rip-stop nylon, two-seats-in-side-by-side configuration, tricycle landing gear and a single 50 hp (37 kW) Rotax 503 engine mounted in pusher configuration.

The aircraft carriage is built from metal tubing. The flight controls are a foot pedal throttle, with handles for the canopy brakes, creating roll and yaw. The main landing gear incorporates spring rod suspension.

The aircraft has an empty weight of 100 kg (220 lb) and a gross weight of 300 kg (661 lb), giving a useful load of 200 kg (441 lb). With full fuel of 29 litres (6.4 imp gal; 7.7 US gal) the payload for crew and baggage is 180 kg (397 lb).

== Specifications (Dual) ==
Data from Bertrand and Manufacturer

General characteristics

- Crew: one
- Capacity: one passenger
- Wingspan: 11 m (35 ft)
- Wing area: 34 m^{2} (370 sq ft)
- Empty weight: 100 kg (220 lb)
- Gross weight: 300 kg (661 lb)
- Fuel capacity: 29 litres (6.4 imp gal; 7.7 US gal)
- Powerplant: 1 × Rotax 503 twin cylinder, two-stroke, air-cooled aircraft engine, 37 kW (50 hp)
- Propellers: 3-bladed composite

Performance

- Maximum speed: 70 km/h (43 mph, 38 kn)
- Cruise speed: 60 km/h (37 mph, 32 kn)
- Never exceed speed: 72 km/h (45 mph, 39 kn)
- Endurance: 2 hours
- Maximum glide ratio: 4.5:1
- Rate of climb: 5 m/s (980 ft/min)
- Rate of sink: 2.99 m/s (588 ft/min)
- Wing loading: 8.8 kg/m^{2} (1.8 lb/sq ft)
