= Duality (film) =

2001 Star Wars fan film

- Directed by: Mark Thomas; Dave Macomber
- Starring: Dave Macomber; Mark Thomas; Stephen Muraoka
- Cinematography: Kevin Jones
- Music by: Alan Derian
- Production company: Crew of Two
- Distributed by: TheForce.net
- Release date: February 10, 2001
- Running time: 6 minutes
- Country: United States
- Language: English

Duality is a Star Wars fan film created by Mark Thomas and Dave Macomber that made its debut on the internet on February 10, 2001. It is one of the first fan films to exclusively use bluescreen footage composited onto virtual backgrounds.

== Plot ==
Sith apprentice Lord Rive (Dave Macomber), is tasked by his master, Darth Oz (Mark Thomas), to battle another apprentice, Darth Blight (Stephem Muraoka), as a final test determining who would serve by Oz’s side. The two would-be Sith clash violently with their double-bladed lightsabers while Oz watches via hologram. After a long and vicious lightsaber duel, Rive's weapon is severed in two and Blight loses his saber. A quick brawl later and the two engage in a final bout with the two halves of Rive's saber. It ends with Rive impaled and Blight bisected through the waist. After they die, Darth Oz appears in the flesh. Consumed with fury and wrath at his failure to procure a permanent apprentice, he electrocutes the bodies of the two failed apprentices with Force Lightning.

A comparison of the storyboards, raw footage, and final frames

== Production ==
Macomber and Thomas originally produced Duel as an acting/choreography demo for an actor, but felt they could make a better film with CG stages, as opposed to the location work on the original. The cast consists of three actors, two of whom are the creators.

The script was first written by Thomas, with Macomber devising the fight. After about 14 months of pre-planning, filming took place at Alamo Studios in Santa Barbara, California, in September 2000. Post-production was split between Thomas and Macomber. Thomas primarily handled the digital backgrounds and 3D animation, while Macomber handled compositing and the lightsaber effects. The final version took four months of post-production, using off-the-shelf software from Electric Image, Adobe, and Apple, and about in out-of-pocket costs.

== Soundtrack ==
The first cut of the film featured music and sound effects taken from Star Wars films, but a later release had all-new music by Alan Derian.

== Reception ==
Reaction to Duality was mostly positive, generating over a half million downloads in its first year of release. Entertainment Weekly said its effects "have the impressive digital sheen of Episode I", while IFILM programming director said the film "absolutely blew me away, and a lot of people out there are saying this is the best they've ever come across." The film showed that film-level special effects could be produced by the common fan. Macomber and Thomas said they had "taken a few calls" from Hollywood effects houses after the film premiered.

Not every reaction was positive though. Various members of the Star Wars fan films community felt that it was short on story and featured dated special effects when compared to other fan films, and that the trollish behavior of Mark Thomas leading up to its release forever tainted the product.

In August 2010, Time magazine's online visitors listed it at no. 7 on their list of the top 10 Star Wars fan films.
