= Distinguished Unit Award =

- NJROTC variant
- Type: Ribbon
- Awarded for: Completing the requirements set by the JROTC's respective Headquarters (changed every year)
- Presented by: HQ AJROTC, HQ AFJROTC, HQ NJROTC
- Eligibility: All JROTC Units
- AFJROTC variant

The Distinguished Unit Award (DUA) is an award given to a Junior Reserve Officer Training Corps unit from their respective headquarters. HQ will send out a representative to review the Unit every year. The Unit is then given the opportunity to improve on the ratings given by the representative. Units must set and accomplish goals for the year to attain this award. The award consists of a ribbon that may be worn on uniforms by the cadets that attained it. If an Air Force JROTC Unit is awarded with Merit, a silver star is added. However, there is a new award ribbon for the distinguished unit award with merit that is separate from the distinguished unit award with just a star added.
