= Peer-Allocated Instant Response =

Peer-Allocated Instant Response (PAIR) is a project in the Netherlands that aims to match students with best-suited peer candidates for online support. It was launched in 2006 by the Open University of the Netherlands, an online university, and was supported by Fontys University and SURF, the national organization in the Netherlands that coordinates ICT in higher education.

The system works as follows: Online students requiring help type their question into an IM-like client; they are then automatically and instantaneously paired with another student who is currently online. When the conversation is over, both parties rate the experience. The currently used allocation algorithm does not perform a semantic analysis of the question; it allocates peer tutors based on their position in the curriculum relative to the help seeker, their past workload and past ratings.

A simulation of the allocation algorithm was carried out and two 8-week pilot projects were conducted at the Open University and the Fontys University.
