= Dual group =

In mathematics, the dual group refer to:

- Pontryagin dual, of a locally compact abelian group
- Langlands dual, of a reductive algebraic group
- The dual group in the Deligne–Lusztig theory
