= Pair =

Pair or PAIR or Pairing may refer to:

== Government and politics ==
- Pair (parliamentary convention), matching of members unable to attend, so as not to change the voting margin
- Pair, a member of the Prussian House of Lords
- Pair, the French equivalent of peer, holder of a French Pairie, a French high title roughly equivalent to a member of the British peerage

== Mathematics ==
- 2 (number), two of something, a pair
- Unordered pair, or pair set, in mathematics and set theory
- Ordered pair, or 2-tuple, in mathematics and set theory
- Pairing, in mathematics, an R-bilinear map of modules, where R is the underlying ring
- Pair type, in programming languages and type theory, a product type with two component types
- Topological pair, an inclusion of topological spaces

== Science and technology ==
- Couple (app), formerly Pair, a mobile application for two people
- PAIR (puncture-aspiration-injection-reaspiration), in medicine
- Pairing, a handshaking process in Bluetooth communications
- Pair programming, an agile software development technique
- Pairing (computing), the linking together of devices to allow communications between them
- Twisted pair, a couple of electric wires twisted together

== Sports and games ==
- Pair, a team of two in pair skating
- Pair (cricket), a cricket term for being out for 0 in both innings of a match
- One pair (poker), a type of poker hand
- Coxless pair or coxed pair, racing rowing shells
- Pairs, one of many alternate names given to Concentration (card game)

== Other uses ==
- Au pair, a work agreement
- Grow a pair, referring to testicles, a slang term meaning act with more courage
- Patent Application Information Retrieval, an online service providing access to the prosecution histories of U.S. patents and patent applications
- Peer-Allocated Instant Response, for distance learning in the Netherlands
- Parts pairing, prevents parts from being swapped
- Wine pairing, the process of pairing food dishes with wine to enhance the dining experience

== See also ==
- Couple (disambiguation), various senses for two joined things
- Even (disambiguation)
- Pear, a fruit
- Pare people, a Tanzanian ethnic group
- Paired t test, Student's t-test for paired data in statistical hypothesis testing
