= Duality (electrical circuits) =

Association of electrical terms into pairs based on interchanging voltage and current

In electrical engineering, electrical terms are associated into pairs called duals. A dual of a relationship is formed by interchanging voltage and current in an expression. The dual expression thus produced is of the same form, and the reason that the dual is always a valid statement can be traced to the duality of electricity and magnetism.

Here is a partial list of electrical dualities:

- voltage – current
- parallel – series (circuits)
- resistance – conductance
- voltage division – current division
- impedance – admittance
- capacitance – inductance
- reactance – susceptance
- short circuit – open circuit
- Kirchhoff's current law (KCL) – Kirchhoff's voltage law (KVL)
- Thévenin's theorem – Norton's theorem

== History ==
The use of duality in circuit theory is due to Alexander Russell who published his ideas in 1904.

== Examples ==
=== Constitutive relations ===
- Resistor and conductor (Ohm's law)
  $$v=iR \iff i=vG \,$$
- Capacitor and inductor – differential form
  $$i_C=C\frac{d}{dt}v_C \iff v_L=L\frac{d}{dt}i_L$$
- Capacitor and inductor – integral form
  $$v_C(t) = V_0 + {1 \over C}\int_{0}^{t} i_C(\tau) \, d\tau \iff  i_L(t) = I_0 + {1 \over L}\int_{0}^{t} v_L(\tau) \, d\tau$$

=== Voltage division — current division ===
$$v_{R_1}=v\frac{R_1}{R_1 + R_2} \iff i_{G_1}=i\frac{G_1}{G_1 + G_2}$$

=== Impedance and admittance ===
- Resistor and conductor
  $$Z_R = R \iff Y_G = G$$
  $$Z_G = {1 \over G } \iff Y_R = { 1 \over R }$$
- Capacitor and inductor
  $$Z_C = {1 \over Cs} \iff  Y_L = {1 \over Ls}$$
  $$Z_L = Ls  \iff  Y_c = Cs$$

== See also ==
- Duality (electricity and magnetism)
- Duality (mechanical engineering)
- Dual impedance
- Dual graph
- Mechanical–electrical analogies
- List of dualities
