= Batman and Robin =

Superhero duo

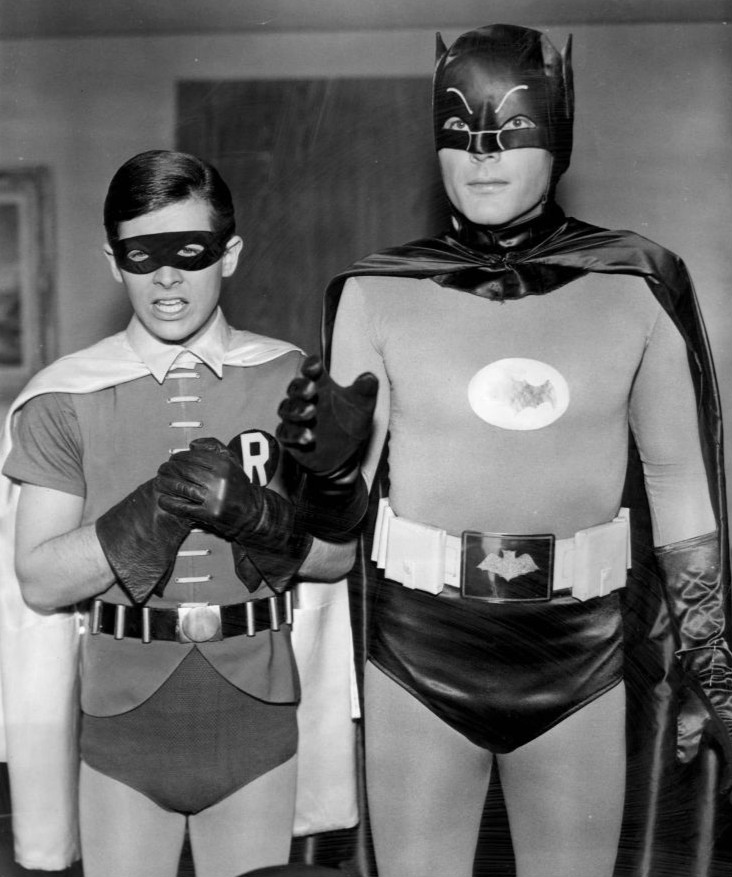
The characters Robin and Batman as portrayed by Burt Ward and Adam West, respectively, in the television series Batman (1966–68)

Batman and Robin are a superhero duo appearing in American comic books published by DC Comics, often referred to as the "Dynamic Duo".

Batman and Robin may also refer to:

== Comics ==
- Batman (comic strip), also known as Batman and Robin or Batman with Robin the Boy Wonder, an American comic strip
- All Star Batman & Robin, the Boy Wonder, an American comic book ongoing series
- Batman and Robin (comic book), an American comic book ongoing series
- Batman and Robin Eternal, an American comic book limited series

== Film and television ==
- Batman and Robin, a 1949 American serial film
- The Adventures of Batman, also known as Batman with Robin the Boy Wonder, a 1968 American animated television series
- Batman: The Animated Series, also known as The Adventures of Batman & Robin, an American animated television series that aired from 1992 to 1995
- Batman & Robin, a 1997 American film
- Batman vs. Robin, a 2015 American animated film

== Video games ==
- The Adventures of Batman & Robin (video game), a 1994 video game
- Batman & Robin (video game), a 1998 video game

== Other uses ==
- Batman & Robin (soundtrack), the soundtrack album for the 1997 film
- Batman & Robin: The Chiller, a roller coaster at Six Flags Great Adventure in Jackson Township, New Jersey
- "Batman and Robin Have an Altercation", a 2012 short story by Stephen King

== See also ==
- Batman (disambiguation)
- Robin (disambiguation)
- Dynamic duo (disambiguation)
