= Heat current =

- Other names: Thermal current
- Common symbols: H
- SI unit: Watt
- Derivations from other quantities: $H = {\Delta Q \over \Delta t} = {\Delta T \over R}$

A heat current or thermal current is a kinetic exchange rate between molecules, relative to the material in which the kinesis occurs. It is defined as the net rate of flow of heat. The SI unit of heat current is the watt, which is the flow of heat across a surface at the rate of one Joule per second.

For conduction, heat current is defined by Fourier's law as

$$\frac{\partial Q}{\partial t} = -k \oint_S{\overrightarrow{\nabla} T \cdot \,\overrightarrow{dS}}$$

where

$\big. \frac{\partial Q}{\partial t}\big.$ is the amount of heat transferred per unit time [W] and
$\overrightarrow{dS}$ is an oriented surface area element [m^{2}]

The above differential equation, when integrated for a homogeneous material of 1-D geometry between two endpoints at constant temperature, gives the heat flow rate as:

$$\big. \frac{\Delta Q}{\Delta t} = -k A \frac{\Delta T}{\Delta x}$$

where

A is the cross-sectional surface area,
$\Delta T$ is the temperature difference between the ends,
$\Delta x$ is the distance between the ends.

For thermal radiation, heat current is defined as

$$W = \sigma \cdot A \cdot T^4$$

where the constant of proportionality $\sigma$ is the Stefan–Boltzmann constant, $A$ is the radiating surface area, and $T$ is temperature.

Heat current can also be thought of as the total phonon distribution multiplied by the energy of one phonon, times the group velocity of the phonons. The phonon distribution of a particular phonon mode is given by the Bose-Einstein factor, which is dependent on temperature and phonon energy.

== See also ==
- Thermal conduction
- Thermal conductivity
