= Aharonov–Casher effect =

Quantum-mechanical phenomenon

The Aharonov–Casher effect is a quantum mechanical phenomenon predicted in 1984 by Yakir Aharonov and Aharon Casher, in which a traveling magnetic dipole is affected by an electric field. It is dual to the Aharonov–Bohm effect, in which the quantum phase of a charged particle depends upon which side of a magnetic flux tube it comes through. In the Aharonov–Casher effect, the particle has a magnetic moment and the tubes are charged instead. It was observed in a gravitational neutron interferometer in 1989 and later by fluxon interference of magnetic vortices in Josephson junctions. It has also been seen with electrons and atoms.

In both effects the particle acquires a phase shift ($\varphi$) while traveling along some path P. In the Aharonov–Bohm effect it is

$$\varphi_{\rm AB} = \frac{q}{\hbar} \int_P \mathbf{A} \cdot d\mathbf{x}$$

while for the Aharonov–Casher effect it is

$$\varphi_{\rm AC} = \frac{1}{\hbar c^2} \int_P (\mathbf{E}\times \boldsymbol \mu) \cdot d\mathbf{x}$$

where $q$ is its charge and $\boldsymbol \mu$ is the magnetic moment. The effects have been observed together.

== Bibliography ==
- Commins, Eugene D. (2014). Quantum Mechanics; an experimentalist's approach. Cambridge University Press. pp. 83–96.
- M. Koenig; A. Tschetschetkin; E.M. Hankiewicz; Jairo Sinova; V. Hock; V. Daumer; et al. (2006). "Direct Observation of the Aharonov–Casher Phase". Phys. Rev. Lett. 96 (7) 076804. arXiv:cond-mat/0508396. Bibcode:2006PhRvL..96g6804K. doi:10.1103/PhysRevLett.96.076804. PMID 16606124. S2CID 7934918.
- T. Boyer (1987). "Proposed Aharonov–Casher effect: Another example of an Aharonov–Bohm effect arising from a classical lag". Phys. Rev. B. 36 (10): 5083–5086. Bibcode:1987PhRvA..36.5083B. doi:10.1103/PhysRevA.36.5083. PMID 9898771.
- Rohrlich, D. (2007). "The Aharonov–Casher effect". arXiv:0708.3744 [quant-ph].
- Meier, Florian; Loss, Daniel (22 April 2003). "Magnetization Transport and Quantized Spin Conductance". Physical Review Letters. 90 (16) 167204. arXiv:cond-mat/0209521. Bibcode:2003PhRvL..90p7204M. doi:10.1103/physrevlett.90.167204. ISSN 0031-9007. PMID 12732002. S2CID 22378460.
- Nakata, Kouki; van Hoogdalem, Kevin A.; Simon, Pascal; Loss, Daniel (15 October 2014). "Josephson and persistent spin currents in Bose-Einstein condensates of magnons". Physical Review B. 90 (14) 144419. arXiv:1406.7004. Bibcode:2014PhRvB..90n4419N. doi:10.1103/physrevb.90.144419. ISSN 1098-0121. S2CID 119214217.
- Frydman, Aviad; Arnab, Roy (6 Mar 2020), "Aharonov-casher Effect With Vortices In An Amorphous Superconductor", Bulletin of the American Physical Society, vol. 65, no. 1

== See also ==
- Duality (electricity and magnetism)
