= Bipartite =

Bipartite may refer to:

- 2 (number)
- Bipartite (theology), a philosophical term describing the human duality of body and soul
- Bipartite graph, in mathematics, a graph in which the vertices are partitioned into two sets and every edge has an endpoint in each set
- Bipartite uterus, a type of uterus found in deer and moose, etc.
- Bipartite treaty, a treaty between two parties

== See also ==
- Dichotomy
