= Duo, West Virginia =

Unincorporated community in West Virginia, United States

- Unincorporated community
- Location within West Virginia Location within the United States
- Coordinates: 38°04′16″N 80°35′51″W
- Country: United States
- State: West Virginia
- County: Greenbrier
- Elevation: 3,373 ft (1,028 m)
- Time zone: UTC-5 (Eastern (EST))
  - Summer (DST): UTC-4 (EDT)
- Area codes: 304 & 681
- GNIS feature ID: 1554339

Duo is an unincorporated community and coal town in Greenbrier County, West Virginia, United States. Duo is 6 miles (9.7 km) east-northeast of Quinwood.

The community was so named on account of there being only two houses standing at the town site.
