= Endings of a New Kind =

Studio album by Taken by Cars
- Released: January 28, 2008
- Genre: Indie rock, alternative dance
- Length: 50:00
- Label: Party Bear, Warner
- Producer: Taken By Cars

Professional ratings
Review scores
Source	Rating
Project Manila	(Favorable)
Two Is Equal To Zero	(B+)

Endings of a New Kind is the debut studio album by the Filipino indie rock band Taken by Cars, released in 2008 on Party Bear Records. Four radio singles have been released from this album including 'A Weeknight Memoir (In High Definition)', 'Uh Oh', 'December 2 Chapter VII', 'Shapeshifter' and 'Neon Brights'.

== Track listing ==
1. "Intro" - 0:51
2. "Uh Oh" - 3:38
3. "The Blackout" - 3:09
4. "Colourway" - 4:09
5. "A Weeknight Memoir (In High Definition)" - 3:37
6. "All For A Tuesday" - 4:16
7. "Logistical Nightmare" - 3:52
8. "Interlude" - 0:13
9. "December 2 Chapter VII" - 4:51
10. "The Afterhours" - 4:35
11. "Stereolove" - 4:48
12. "Neon Brights" - 3:28
13. "Shapeshifter" - 8:33
