= Duality (electricity and magnetism) =

All magnetic phenomena have analogous electric phenomena and vice versa

In physics, the electromagnetic dual concept is based on the idea that, in the static case, electromagnetism has two separate facets: electric fields and magnetic fields. Expressions in one of these will have a directly analogous, or dual, expression in the other. The reason for this can ultimately be traced to special relativity, where applying the Lorentz transformation to the electric field will transform it into a magnetic field. These are special cases of duality in mathematics.

- The electric field (E) is the dual of the magnetic field (H).
- The electric displacement field (D) is the dual of the magnetic flux density (B).
- Faraday's law of induction is the dual of Ampère's circuital law.
- Gauss's law for electric field is the dual of Gauss's law for magnetism.
- The electric potential is the dual of the magnetic potential.
- Permittivity is the dual of permeability.
- Electrostriction is the dual of magnetostriction.
- Piezoelectricity is the dual of piezomagnetism.
- Ferroelectricity is the dual of ferromagnetism.
- An electrostatic motor is the dual of a magnetic motor;
- Electrets are the dual of permanent magnets;
- The Faraday effect is the dual of the Kerr effect;
- The Zeeman effect is the dual of the Stark effect;
- The hypothetical magnetic monopole is the dual of electric charge.

Additionally, in a sense different from the dualities above:

- The Aharonov–Casher effect is the dual to the Aharonov–Bohm effect.

In the usual sense of electromagnetic duality, the (unobserved) dual of the Aharonov-Bohm effect would be the phase acquired by a hypothetical magnetic monopole traveling through electric field. In contrast, the Aharonov–Casher effect is for a magnetic dipole (moment) in electric field, and its dual in the usual sense is for an electric dipole in magnetic field, which is distinct from the Aharonov–Bohm effect.

== See also ==
- Maxwell's equations
- Duality (electrical circuits)
- List of dualities
