= Dualism in cosmology =

Two fundamental and often opposing concepts

Dualism or dualistic cosmology is the belief that two fundamental concepts exist, which often oppose each other. It is an umbrella term that covers a diversity of views from various religions, including both traditional religions and scriptural religions.

Moral dualism is the belief of the great complement of, or conflict between, the benevolent and the malevolent. It simply implies that there are two moral opposites at work, independent of any interpretation of what might be "moral" and independent of how these may be represented. Moral opposites might, for example, exist in a worldview that has one god, more than one god, or none. By contrast, duotheism, bitheism or ditheism implies (at least) two gods. While bitheism implies harmony, ditheism implies rivalry and opposition, such as between good and evil, or light and dark, or summer and winter. For example, a ditheistic system could be one in which one god is a creator and the other a destroyer. In theology, dualism can also refer to the relationship between the deity and creation or the deity and the universe (see theistic dualism). That form of dualism is a belief shared in certain traditions of Christianity and Hinduism. Alternatively, in ontological dualism, the world is divided into two overarching categories. Within Chinese culture and philosophy the opposition and combination of the universe's two basic principles are expressed as yin and yang and are traditionally foundational doctrine of Taoism, Confucianism and some Chinese Buddhist Schools.

Many myths and creation motifs with dualistic cosmologies have been described in ethnographic and anthropological literature. The motifs conceive the world as being created, organized, or influenced by two demiurges, culture heroes, or other mythological beings, who compete with each other or have a complementary function in creating, arranging or influencing the world. There is a huge diversity of such cosmologies. In some cases, such as among the Chukchi, the beings collaborate rather than compete, and they contribute to the creation in a coequal way. In many other instances the two beings are not of the same importance or power (sometimes, one of them is even characterized as gullible). Sometimes they can be contrasted as good versus evil. They may be often believed to be twins or at least brothers. Dualistic motifs in mythologies can be observed in all inhabited continents. Zolotarjov concludes that they cannot be explained by diffusion or borrowing but are rather of convergent origin. They are related to a dualistic organization of society (moieties); in some cultures, the social organization may have ceased to exist, but mythology preserves the memory in more and more disguised ways.

== Moral dualism ==
Moral dualism is the belief of the great complement or conflict between the benevolent and the malevolent. Like ditheism/bitheism (see below), moral dualism does not imply the absence of monist or monotheistic principles. Moral dualism simply implies that there are two moral opposites at work, independent of any interpretation of what might be "moral" and—unlike ditheism/bitheism—independent of how these may be represented.

For example, Mazdaism (Mazdean Zoroastrianism) is both dualistic and monotheistic (but not monist by definition) since in that philosophy God—the Creator—is purely good, and the antithesis—which is also uncreated—is an absolute one. Mandaeism is monotheistic and Gnostic and in its cosmology, the World of Light (alma d-nhūra) that is good, is contrasted with the World of Darkness or underworld (alma d-hšuka) that is evil. Zurvanism (Zurvanite Zoroastrianism) and Manichaeism are representative of dualistic and monist philosophies since each has a supreme and transcendental First Principle from which the two equal-but-opposite entities then emanate. This is also true for the suppressed Christian gnostic religions, such as Bogomils, Catharism, and so on. More complex forms of monist dualism also exist, for instance in Hermeticism, where Nous "thought"—that is described to have created man—brings forth both good and evil, dependent on interpretation, whether it receives prompting from the God or from the Demon. Duality with pluralism is considered a logical fallacy.

=== History ===
Moral dualism began as a theological belief. Dualism was first seen implicitly in Egyptian religious beliefs by the contrast of the gods Set (disorder, death) and Osiris (order, life). The first explicit conception of dualism came from the Ancient Persian religion of Zoroastrianism around the mid-fifth century BC. Zoroastrianism is a monotheistic religion that believes that Ahura Mazda is the eternal creator of all good things. Any violations of Ahura Mazda's order arise from druj, which is everything uncreated. From this comes a significant choice for humans to make. Either they fully participate in human life for Ahura Mazda or they do not and give druj power. Personal dualism is even more distinct in the beliefs of later religions.

The religious dualism of Christianity between good and evil is not a perfect dualism as God (good) will inevitably destroy Satan (evil). Early Christian dualism is largely based on Platonic Dualism (See: Neoplatonism and Christianity). There is also a personal dualism in Christianity with a soul-body distinction based on the idea of an immaterial Christian soul.

== Duotheism, ditheism, bitheism ==
When used with regards to multiple gods, dualism may refer to duotheism, bitheism, or ditheism. Although ditheism/bitheism imply moral dualism, they are not equivalent: ditheism/bitheism implies (at least) two gods, while moral dualism does not necessarily imply theism (theos = god) at all.

Both bitheism and ditheism imply a belief in two equally powerful gods with complementary or antonymous properties; however, while bitheism implies harmony, ditheism implies rivalry and opposition, such as between good and evil, bright and dark, or summer and winter. For example, a ditheistic system would be one in which one god is creative, the other is destructive (cf. theodicy). In the original conception of Zoroastrianism, for example, Ahura Mazda was the spirit of ultimate good, while Ahriman (Angra Mainyu) was the spirit of ultimate evil.

In a bitheistic system, by contrast, where the two deities are not in conflict or opposition, one could be male and the other female (cf. duotheism). One well-known example of a bitheistic or duotheistic theology based on gender polarity is found in the neopagan religion of Wicca. In Wicca, dualism is represented in the belief of a god and a goddess as a dual partnership in ruling the universe. This is centered on the worship of a divine couple, the Moon Goddess and the Horned God, who are regarded as lovers. However, there is also a ditheistic theme within traditional Wicca, as the Horned God has dual aspects of bright and dark—relating to day/night, summer/winter—expressed as the Oak King and the Holly King, who in Wiccan myth and ritual are said to engage in battle twice a year for the hand of the Goddess, resulting in the changing seasons. (Within Wicca, bright and dark do not correspond to notions of "good" and "evil" but are aspects of the natural world, much like yin and yang in Taoism.)

=== Radical and mitigated dualism ===
- Radical Dualism – or absolute Dualism which posits two co-equal divine forces. Manichaeism conceives of two previously coexistent realms of light and darkness which become embroiled in conflict, owing to the chaotic actions of the latter. Subsequently, certain elements of the light became entrapped within darkness; the purpose of material creation is to enact the slow process of extraction of these individual elements, at the end of which the kingdom of light will prevail over darkness. Manicheanism likely inherits this dualistic mythology from Zoroastrianism, in which the eternal spirit Ahura Mazda is opposed by his antithesis, Angra Mainyu; the two are engaged in a cosmic struggle, the conclusion of which will likewise see Ahura Mazda triumphant. The 'Hymn of the Pearl' included the belief that the material world corresponds to some sort of malevolent intoxication brought about by the powers of darkness to keep elements of the light trapped inside it in a state of drunken distraction.
- Mitigated Dualism – is where one of the two principles is in some way inferior to the other. Such classical Gnostic movements as the Sethians conceived of the material world as being created by a lesser divinity than the true God that was the object of their devotion. The spiritual world is conceived of as being radically different from the material world, co-extensive with the true God, and the true home of certain enlightened members of humanity; thus, these systems were expressive of a feeling of acute alienation within the world, and their resultant aim was to allow the soul to escape the constraints presented by the physical realm.

However, bitheistic and ditheistic principles are not always so easily contrastable, for instance in a system where one god is the representative of summer and drought and the other of winter and rain/fertility (cf. the mythology of Persephone). Marcionism, an early Christian sect, held that the Old and New Testaments were the work of two opposing gods: both were First Principles, but of different religions.

== Theistic dualism ==
In theology, dualism can refer to the relationship between God and creation or God and the universe. This form of dualism is a belief shared in certain traditions of Christianity and Hinduism.

=== Zoroastrianism ===
Zoroastrianism or "Mazdayasna" is one of the world's oldest continuously-practiced religions, based on the teachings of the Iranian-speaking prophet Zoroaster. It has a dualistic cosmology of good and evil and an eschatology which predicts the ultimate conquest of evil by good. Zoroastrianism exalts an uncreated and benevolent deity of wisdom known as Ahura Mazda (lit. 'Wise Lord') as its supreme being.

=== Manichaeism ===
Manichaeism was a major religion founded in the 3rd century AD by the Parthian prophet Mani (c. 216 – c. 274 AD), in the Sasanian Empire. Manichaeism taught an elaborate dualistic cosmology describing the struggle between a good, spiritual world of light, and an evil, material world of darkness. Through an ongoing process that takes place in human history, light is gradually removed from the world of matter and returned to the world of light, whence it came. Its beliefs were based on local Mesopotamian religious movements and Gnosticism.

=== In Christianity ===
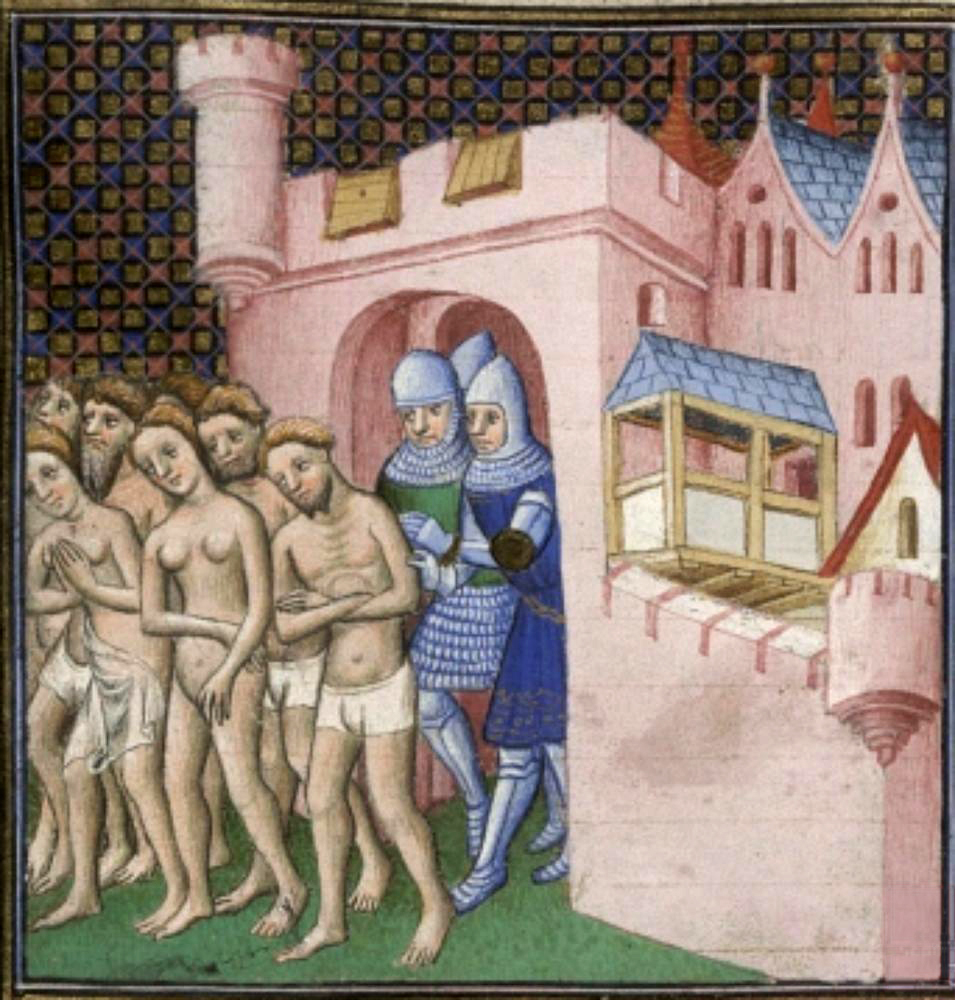
The Cathars being expelled from Carcassonne in 1209. The Cathars were denounced as heretics by the Roman Catholic Church for their dualist beliefs.

The dualism between God and Creation has existed as a central belief in multiple historical sects and traditions of Christianity, including Marcionism, Catharism, Paulicianism, and other forms of Gnostic Christianity. Christian dualism refers to the belief that God and creation are distinct, but interrelated through an indivisible bond. However, Gnosticism is a diverse, syncretistic religious movement consisting of various belief systems generally united in a belief in a distinction between a supreme, transcendent God and a blind, evil demiurge responsible for creating the material universe, thereby trapping the divine spark within matter. Gnosticism is not limited to Christianity, and also incorporates beliefs from other Abrahamic traditions, such as early Jewish sects.

In sects like the Cathars and the Paulicians, this is a dualism between the material world, created by an evil god, and a moral god. Historians divide Christian dualism into absolute dualism, which held that the good and evil gods were equally powerful, and mitigated dualism, which held that material evil was subordinate to the spiritual good. The belief, by Christian theologians who adhere to a libertarian or compatibilist view of free will, that free will separates humankind from God has also been characterized as a form of dualism. The theologian Leroy Stephens Rouner compares the dualism of Christianity with the dualism that exists in Zoroastrianism and the Samkhya tradition of Hinduism. The theological use of the word dualism dates back to 1700, in a book that describes the dualism between good and evil.

The tolerance of dualism ranges widely among the different Christian traditions. As a monotheistic religion, the conflict between dualism and monism has existed in Christianity since its inception. The 1912 Catholic Encyclopedia describes that, in the Catholic Church, "the dualistic hypothesis of an eternal world existing side by side with God was of course rejected" by the thirteenth century, but mind–body dualism was not. The problem of evil is difficult to reconcile with absolute monism, and has prompted some Christian sects to veer towards dualism. Gnostic forms of Christianity were more dualistic, and some Gnostic traditions posited that the Devil was separate from God as an independent deity. The Christian dualists of the Byzantine Empire, the Paulicians, were seen as Manichean heretics by Byzantine theologians. This tradition of Christian dualism, founded by Constantine-Silvanus, argued that the universe was created through evil and separate from a moral God.

==== Cathars ====
The Cathars, a Christian sect in southern France, believed that there was a dualism between two gods, one representing good and the other representing evil. Whether or not the Cathari possessed direct historical influence from ancient Gnosticism is a matter of dispute, as the basic conceptions of Gnostic cosmology are to be found in Cathar beliefs (most distinctly in their notion of a lesser creator god), though unlike the second century Gnostics, they did not apparently place any special relevance upon knowledge (gnosis) as an effective salvific force. In any case, the Roman Catholic Church denounced the Cathars as heretics, and sought to crush the movement in the 13th century. The Albigensian Crusade was initiated by Pope Innocent III in 1208 to remove the Cathars from Languedoc in France, where they were known as Albigensians. The Inquisition, which began in 1233 under Pope Gregory IX, also targeted the Cathars.

=== In Hinduism ===
The Dvaita Vedanta school of Indian philosophy espouses a dualism between God and the universe by theorizing the existence of two separate realities. The first and the more important reality is that of Shiva or Shakti or Vishnu or Brahman. Shiva or Shakti or Vishnu is the supreme Self, God, the absolute truth of the universe, the independent reality. The second reality is that of dependent but equally real universe that exists with its own separate essence. Everything that is composed of the second reality, such as individual soul (Jiva), matter, etc. exist with their own separate reality. The distinguishing factor of this philosophy as opposed to Advaita Vedanta (monistic conclusion of Vedas) is that God takes on a personal role and is seen as a real eternal entity that governs and controls the universe. Because the existence of individuals is grounded in the divine, they are depicted as reflections, images or even shadows of the divine, but never in any way identical with the divine. Salvation therefore is described as the realization that all finite reality is essentially dependent on the Supreme.

== Ontological dualism ==
The yin and yang symbolizes the duality in nature and all things in Traditional Chinese Medicine, Confucianism and Taoist religion.

Alternatively, dualism can mean the tendency of humans to perceive and understand the world as being divided into two overarching categories. In this sense, it is dualistic when one perceives a tree as a thing separate from everything surrounding it. This form of ontological dualism exists in Taoism and Confucianism and a foundational theory within Traditional Chinese medicine, beliefs that divide the universe into the complementary oppositions of yin and yang. In traditions such as classical Hinduism (Samkhya, Yoga, Vaisheshika and the later Vedanta schools, which accepted the theory of Gunas), Chinese Pure land and Zen Buddhism or Islamic Sufism, a key to enlightenment is "transcending" this sort of dualistic thinking, without merely substituting dualism with monism or pluralism.

=== In Chinese philosophy ===
The opposition and combination of the universe's two basic principles of yin and yang is a large part of Chinese philosophy, and is an important feature of Taoism, both as a philosophy and as a religion, although the concept developed much earlier. Some argue that yin and yang were originally an earth and sky god, respectively.

Some of the common associations with yang and yin, respectively, are: male and female, light and dark, active and passive, motion and stillness. Some scholars believe that the two ideas may have originally referred to two opposite sides of a mountain, facing towards and away from the sun. The yin and yang symbol actually has very little to do with Western dualism; instead it represents the philosophy of balance, where two opposites co-exist in harmony and are able to transmute into each other. In the yin-yang symbol there is a dot of yin in yang and a dot of yang in yin. In Taoism, this symbolizes the inter-connectedness of the opposite forces as different aspects of Tao, the First Principle. Contrast is needed to create a distinguishable reality, without which we would experience nothingness. Therefore, the independent principles of yin and yang are actually dependent on one another for each other's distinguishable existence.

The complementary dualistic concept seen in yin and yang represent the reciprocal interaction throughout nature, related to a feedback loop, where opposing forces do not exchange in opposition but instead exchange reciprocally to promote stabilization similar to homeostasis. An underlying principle in Taoism states that within every independent entity lies a part of its opposite. Within sickness lies health and vice versa. This is because all opposites are manifestations of the single Tao, and are therefore not independent from one another, but rather a variation of the same unifying force throughout all of nature.

=== In Mesoamerican cosmology ===
Dualism features prominently in traditional Mesoamerican religion and features numerous binaries including cold/hot, male/female, moon/sun, dark/light, and rainy season/dry season. These opposing forces often required human intervention to remain in balance, if left on their own, either one force could overpower the other, or they could reach a perfect equilibrium and cancel each other out. Similary to in Chinese mythology, nothing in Mesoamerican mythology is considered to reside purely in one category, but instead contains combinations of both. Something's classification is determined by which of the forces is most prevalent.

== In other religions ==
=== Samoyed peoples ===
In a Nenets myth, Num and Nga collaborate and compete with each other, creating land, there are also other myths about competing-collaborating demiurges.

=== Comparative studies of Kets and neighboring peoples ===
Among others, also dualistic myths were investigated in researches which tried to compare the mythologies of Siberian peoples and settle the problem of their origins. Vyacheslav Ivanov and Vladimir Toporov compared the mythology of Ket people with those of speakers of Uralic languages, assuming in the studies, that there are modelling semiotic systems in the compared mythologies; and they have also made typological comparisons. Among others, from possibly Uralic mythological analogies, those of Ob-Ugric peoples and Samoyedic peoples are mentioned. Some other discussed analogies (similar folklore motifs, and purely typological considerations, certain binary pairs in symbolics) may be related to dualistic organization of society—some of such dualistic features can be found at these compared peoples. It must be admitted that, for Kets, neither dualistic organization of society nor cosmological dualism has been researched thoroughly: if such features existed at all, they have either weakened or remained largely undiscovered; although there are some reports on division into two exogamous patrilinear moieties, folklore on conflicts of mythological figures, and also on cooperation of two beings in creating the land: the diving of the water fowl. If we include dualistic cosmologies meant in broad sense, not restricted to certain concrete motifs, then we find that they are much more widespread, they exist not only among some Siberian peoples, but there are examples in each inhabited continent.

=== Chukchi ===
A Chukchi myth and its variations report the creation of the world; in some variations, it is achieved by the collaboration of several beings (birds, collaborating in a coequal way; or the creator and the raven, collaborating in a coequal way; or the creator alone, using the birds only as assistants).

=== Fuegians ===
All three Fuegian tribes had dualistic myths about culture heroes. The Yámana have dualistic myths about the two brothers. They act as culture heroes, and sometimes stand in an antagonistic relation with each other, introducing opposite laws. Their figures can be compared to the Kwanyip-brothers of the Selkʼnam. In general, the presence of dualistic myths in two compared cultures does not imply relatedness or diffusion necessarily.

== See also ==
- Cosmology – Study of the universe
- Didache – The Two Ways
- Duality
- Evil twin – Archetype
- Gnosticism – Early Christian and Jewish religious systems
- Mind-body dualism – Philosophical view that consiousness and the body are fundamentally different
- Nondualism – Nonconceptual awareness and interconnectedness
- Pantheism – Belief that God and reality are identical
- Table of Opposites – Philosophical system based on the teachings of Pythagoras
- Trinity – Christian doctrine
- Yanantin – Characteristic of Andean philosophy

== Bibliography ==
- Anisimov, F. А. (1966). Dukhovnaya zhizn' pervobytnogo obshchestva Духовная жизнь первобытново общества [The spiritual life of the primitive commune] (in Russian). Moscow: Leningrad: Nauka.
- Anisimov, F. А. (1971). Istoricheskiye osobennosti pervobytnogo myshleniya Исторические особенности первобытново мышления [Historical futures of the primitive mind] (in Russian). Moscow: Leningrad: Nauka.
- Gusinde, Martin (1966). Nordwind—Südwind. Mythen und Märchen der Feuerlandindianer [North wind—south wind. Myths and tales of Fuegians] (in German). Kassel: E. Röth.
- Ivanov, Vyacheslav; Toporov, Vladimir (1973). "Towards the Description of Ket Semiotic Systems". Semiotica. 9 (4). The Hague; Prague; New York: Mouton: 318–346.
- Ivanov, Vjacseszlav (1984a). "Nyelvek és mitológiák" [Languages and mythologies]. Nyelv, mítosz, kultúra [Language, myth, culture] (in Hungarian). Collected, appendix, editorial afterword by Hoppál, Mihály. Budapest: Gondolat. ISBN 963-281-186-0.
- Ivanov, Vjacseszlav (1984b). "Obi-ugor és ket folklórkapcsolatok" [Obi-Ugric and Ket folklore contacts]. Nyelv, mítosz, kultúra [Language, myth, culture] (in Hungarian). Collected, appendix, editorial afterword by Hoppál, Mihály. Budapest: Gondolat. pp. 215–233. ISBN 963-281-186-0.
- Lavazza, Andrea; Robinson, Howard, eds. (2014). Contemporary Dualism: A Defense. Routledge Studies in Contemporary Philosophy. New York: Routledge. ISBN 978-0-415-81882-7.
- Popov, Igor N. (2010). Metafizika absolyutnogo dualizma: oratoriya preodoleniya Метафизика абсолютного дуализма: оратория преодоления [Metaphysics of Absolute Dualism: an oratorio of the overcoming] (in Russian). Barnaul: Azbuka. ISBN 978-5-93957-396-2.
- Riparelli, Enrico (2008). Il volto del Cristo dualista. Da Marcione ai catari [The face of the dualistic Christ. From Marcion to the Cathars] (in Italian). Bern; Berlin; Bruxelles; Frankfurt am Main; New York; Oxford; Wien: Peter Lang. ISBN 978-3-03911-490-0.
- Vértes, Edit (1990). Szibériai nyelvrokonaink hitvilága [Belief systems of our language relatives in Siberia] (in Hungarian). Budapest: Tankönyvkiadó. ISBN 963-18-2603-1.
- Zolotarjov, A. M. (1980). "Társadalomszervezet és dualisztikus teremtésmítoszok Szibériában" [Social structure and dualistic creation myths in Siberia]. In Hoppál, Mihály (ed.). A Tejút fiai. Tanulmányok a finnugor népek hitvilágáról [The sons of Milky Way. Studies on the belief systems of Finno-Ugric peoples] (in Hungarian). Budapest: Európa Könyvkiadó. pp. 29–58. ISBN 963-07-2187-2.
