= Dual =

Dual or Duals may refer to:

== Paired/two things ==
- Dual (mathematics), a notion of paired concepts that mirror one another
  - Dual (category theory), a formalization of mathematical duality
    - see more cases in Category:Duality (mathematics)
- Dual number, a number system used in automatic differentiation
- Dual (grammatical number), a grammatical category used in some languages
- Dual county, a Gaelic games county which competes in both Gaelic football and hurling
- Dual diagnosis, a psychiatric diagnosis of co-occurrence of substance abuse and a mental problem
- Dual fertilization, simultaneous application of a P-type and N-type fertilizer
- Dual impedance, electrical circuits that are the dual of each other
- Dual SIM cellphone supporting use of two SIMs
- Aerochute International Dual a two-seat Australian powered parachute design

== Acronyms and other uses ==
- Dual (brand), a manufacturer of Hifi equipment
- DUAL (cognitive architecture), an artificial intelligence design model
- DUAL algorithm, or diffusing update algorithm, used to update Internet protocol routing tables
- Dual language, alternative spelling of the Australian Aboriginal Dhuwal language
- DUAL table, a special one-row and one-column database table
- Dual-Ghia, US-brand of luxury-car of the late 1950s

== Media ==
- Dual (2008 film), a 2008 western drama film
- Dual (2022 film), a 2022 science fiction thriller film
- "Dual" (Heroes), an episode of Heroes
- Dual! Parallel Trouble Adventure, an anime series
- Dual (album), an album of traditional Scottish and Irish music recorded by Éamonn Doorley, Muireann Nic Amhlaoibh, Julie Fowlis and Ross Martin, released 2008
- Dual (EP), a 2013 EP by Sampha
- Duals, an album by U2
- The Duals, American duo
- Dual (brand), brand name of audio and video electronics.

== People ==
- Duall (c.1795 – c.1840), an Indigenous Australian outlaw and explorer

== See also ==
- Duality (disambiguation)
- Duel (disambiguation), a homonym
- Double (disambiguation)
- Duo (disambiguation)
- Pair (disambiguation)
- Twin (disambiguation)
