= Marti =

Marti may refer to

- Marti (surname), a surname
- Marti, Montopoli in Val d'Arno, a village in the province of Pisa, Italy
- MARTI Electronics, a manufacturer of remote location broadcasting equipment
- Marti Group, a Swiss construction company
- Soviet minelayer Marti, originally the Russian yacht Standart
- Marti Venturi, fictional character in the Canadian Disney Channel show Life with Derek

== Given name ==
- Marti Caine (1944–1995), English comedian
- Marti Gould Cummings, American drag queen and activist
- Marti Noxon (born 1964), U.S. scriptwriter
- Marti Pellow (born 1965), Scottish singer
- Marti Webb (born 1944), UK singer/actress
- Marti Wong, Chinese games designer

== See also ==
- Marty (disambiguation)
- Martí (disambiguation)
- Martin (disambiguation)
