= Broadcast Electronics =

American broadcast equipment manufacturer

- Company type: Private
- Industry: FM Broadcast, AM Broadcast, Radio Automation
- Founded: 1959
- Headquarters: Quincy, Illinois, United States
- Products: Low Power, High-power RF systems, Radio Automation Systems
- Website: www.bdcast.com

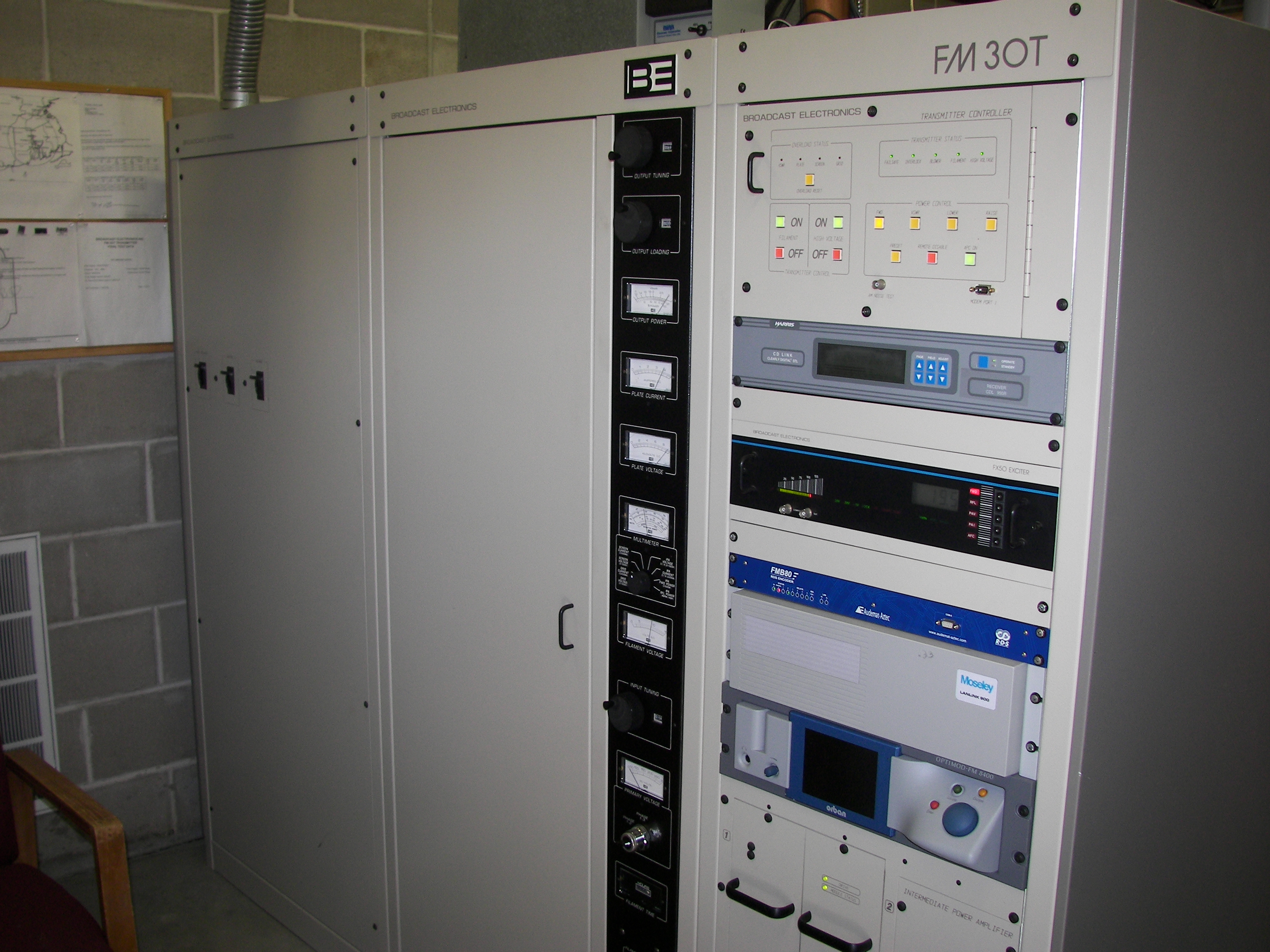
A Broadcast Electronics transmitter installed at WHJY in Providence, RI

Broadcast Electronics (BE) is a manufacturer of AM and FM transmitters, Marti Electronics STL and RPU equipment, developer of the AudioVAULT radio automation system and parent company to Commotion - a social media company for radio.

Founded in 1959 in Silver Spring, Maryland, BE initially manufactured endless loop cartridge "cart" machines. Through the years, BE also manufactured turntables, audio consoles, and program automation equipment which was the precursor to today’s automation systems for radio stations.

In 1977, BE relocated to Quincy, Illinois and it was there that BE began designing and manufacturing FM and AM transmitters. Initially the offering was for tube transmitters but their line also expanded to solid state broadcast transmitters.

The AudioVAULT automation system was one of the first digital audio storage and playout solutions for radio. AudioVAULT compensated for the slow PC processing speeds at the time by manufacturing their own sound cards and using off-bus technology. Today, AudioVAUL is in its 4th generation architecture since the time the technology was known as a "cart" machine replacement product.

In 1994, BE acquired MARTI Electronics. Today, Marti Electronics equipment is also manufactured in Quincy, Illinois.

BE is the largest radio only equipment manufacturer in the United States.

In December 2017, BE was acquired by Italian manufacturer Elenos.

In March 2026, BE was acquired by CEO Rich Redmond and The Alzana Group.
