= Martí =

Martí is a Catalan name and may refer to:

== People ==
=== Surname ===
- Antoni Martí (1963–2023), Andorran architect and politician
- Cristóbal Martí (1903–1986), Spanish footballer
- David Martí (born 1971), Spanish Oscar winner for best makeup
- Dolors Martí Domènech (1901–1970), Spanish Catalan politician
- Enriqueta Martí (1868–1913), Spanish "witch"
- Farabundo Martí (1893–1932), Salvadoran revolutionary
- Fernando Martí (c. 1994–2008), Mexican kidnap and murder victim
- Inka Martí (born 1964), Spanish journalist, editor, writer, and photographer
- Javier Martí (born 1992), Spanish tennis player
- Jesús Martí Martín (1899–1975), Spanish architect who migrated to Mexico
- José Luis Martí (born 1975), Spanish footballer
- Joan Martí i Alanis (1928–2009), co-prince of Andorra
- José Martí (1853–1895), Cuban national hero and poet
- Josep Maria Martí (born 2005), Spanish racing driver
- Juan José Martí (1570–1604), Spanish novelist
- Marcel Martí (1925–2010), Argentine-born sculptor
- Maria Antònia Martí, Spanish Catalan linguist
- Nerea Martí (born 2002), Spanish racing driver
- Paula Martí (born 1980), Spanish golfer

=== Given name ===
- Martí Joan de Galba, 15th-century Spanish author

== Other uses ==
- Farabundo Martí National Liberation Front, a political party in El Salvador
- Martí, Cuba, a town in the province of Matanzas
- José Martí International Airport, Havana, Cuba
- Radio y Televisión Martí, U.S. government propaganda outlets broadcasting to Cuba
- Martí (crater), a crater on Mercury

== See also ==
- Marty (disambiguation)
- Marti (disambiguation)
