= Marti (surname) =

Marci is a surname. Notable people with the surname include:

- Agostino Marti (1482 – after 1542/43), Italian painter
- Alina Marti (born 2004), Swiss ice hockey player and member of the Swiss national ice hockey team
- Anton Marti (1923 –2004), Croatian television and theatre director
- Benedictus Aretius (non-Latinized surname Marti; 1504–1574), Swiss Protestant theologian and natural philosopher
- Bernard Marti (born 1943), Swiss orienteering competitor
- Bernart Marti, troubadour, composing poems and satires in Occitan, in the mid-twelfth century.
- Berthe Marti (1904–1995), Swiss scholar of mediaeval Latin
- Christian Marti (born 1993), Swiss professional ice hockey defenceman
- Debbie Marti (born 1968), English high jumper
- Dolors Marti Domenech, only woman in Tarragona, Spain, to have a public career and to hold a position of political responsibility with the Catalan Republican government, 1937-1939.
- Don Marti, writer and advocate for free and open source software
- Eduard Marti (1829 – 1896), Swiss politician and President of the Swiss National Council
- Fred Marti (born 1940), American professional golfer.
- Hugh A. Marti, American retailer, Long Beach, California
- Hugo Marti (1893–1937), Swiss Germanist, writer and literary editor
- Kurt Marti (1921 – 2017), Swiss theologian and poet
- Lara Marti (born 1999), Swiss footballer
- Liselotte Marti (1956 – 2014), Swiss gymnast
- Luis Marti, electrical engineer at Hydro One Networks Inc. in Toronto
- Marcel Marti (born 1983), Swiss ski mountaineer
- Melanie Marti (born 1986), Swiss former artistic gymnast
- Min Li Marti (born 1974), Swiss politician, publisher, sociologist and historian
- Oliver Marti, Canadian-American healthcare investor, hedge fund manager and former professional lacrosse player
- Peter Marti (1952 –2023), Swiss footballer
- Rafinha Marti (born 1987), Brazilian footballer
- Rudolf Marti (born 1950), Swiss bobsledder
- Samira Marti (born 1994), politician of the Social Democratic Party of Switzerland
- T. J. Marti, American businessman, pharmacist, and politician
- Virgil Marti (born 1962), American visual artist
- Walter Marti (1910–1992), Swiss boxer
- Werner Marti (born 1957), Swiss lawyer and politician
- Werner Marti (ski mountaineer) (born 1989), Swiss ski mountaineer
- Yann Marti (born 1988), Swiss tennis player
- Yves-Michel Marti, pioneer in the field of Competitive Intelligence

== See also ==
- Marti (disambiguation)
- Martin (surname)
- Martini (surname)
