= Mardy =

Mardy can refer to:

As a place name

- Mardy, Monmouthshire, Wales
- Mardy, Shropshire, England

People

- Mardy Collins, American professional basketball player
- Mardy Fish, American professional tennis player

In music

- "Mardy Bum", a song by British indie band Arctic Monkeys, from their debut album Whatever People Say I Am, That's What I'm Not

== See also ==
- Marty (disambiguation)
