= Maine Prairie Township, Stearns County, Minnesota =

Maine Prairie Township, Minnesota
- Township
- Location within the state of Minnesota Maine Prairie Township, Minnesota (the United States)
- Coordinates: 45°23′N 94°20′W
- Country: United States
- State: Minnesota
- County: Stearns

Area
  - Total: 65.2 sq mi (168.8 km^{2})
  - Land: 61.9 sq mi (160.2 km^{2})
  - Water: 3.3 sq mi (8.6 km^{2})
- Elevation: 1,132 ft (345 m)

Population (2010)
  - Total: 1,887
  - Density: 30.51/sq mi (11.78/km^{2})
- Time zone: UTC-6 (Central (CST))
  - Summer (DST): UTC-5 (CDT)
- FIPS code: 27-39518
- GNIS feature ID: 0664879
- Website: https://www.maineprairietownship.com/

Maine Prairie Township is a township in Stearns County, Minnesota, United States. The population was 1,887 at the 2010 census.

Maine Prairie Township was organized in 1858, and named after the state of Maine, the native home of a large share of its first settlers.

== Geography ==
According to the United States Census Bureau, the township has a total area of 65.2 square miles (168.8 km^{2}); 61.9 square miles (160.2 km^{2}) is land and 3.3 square miles (8.6 km^{2}), or 5.09%, is water.

Minnesota State Highway 15 serves as a main route in the township. The township includes the city of Kimball, as well as the unincorporated community of Marty, to the north just west of Pearl Lake.

Maine Prairie Township is located in Townships 121 and 122 North of the Arkansas Base Line and Range 29 West of the 5th Principal Meridian.

== Demographics ==
As of the census of 2000, there were 1,686 people, 581 households, and 474 families residing in the township. The population density was 29.9 inhabitants per square mile (11.5/km^{2}). There were 673 housing units at an average density of 11.9 per square mile (4.6/km^{2}). The racial makeup of the township was 98.81% White, 0.12% African American, 0.12% Native American, 0.30% Asian, 0.18% from other races, and 0.47% from two or more races. Hispanic or Latino of any race were 0.18% of the population.

There were 581 households, out of which 39.8% had children under the age of 18 living with them, 72.8% were married couples living together, 4.8% had a female householder with no husband present, and 18.4% were non-families. 14.6% of all households were made up of individuals, and 5.2% had someone living alone who was 65 years of age or older. The average household size was 2.90 and the average family size was 3.22.

In the township the population was spread out, with 29.0% under the age of 18, 7.1% from 18 to 24, 30.8% from 25 to 44, 23.0% from 45 to 64, and 10.1% who were 65 years of age or older. The median age was 36 years. For every 100 females, there were 115.3 males. For every 100 females age 18 and over, there were 115.3 males.

The median income for a household in the township was $50,833, and the median income for a family was $55,769. Males had a median income of $36,116 versus $23,802 for females. The per capita income for the township was $19,875. About 1.5% of families and 3.1% of the population were below the poverty line, including 2.7% of those under age 18 and 3.5% of those age 65 or over.

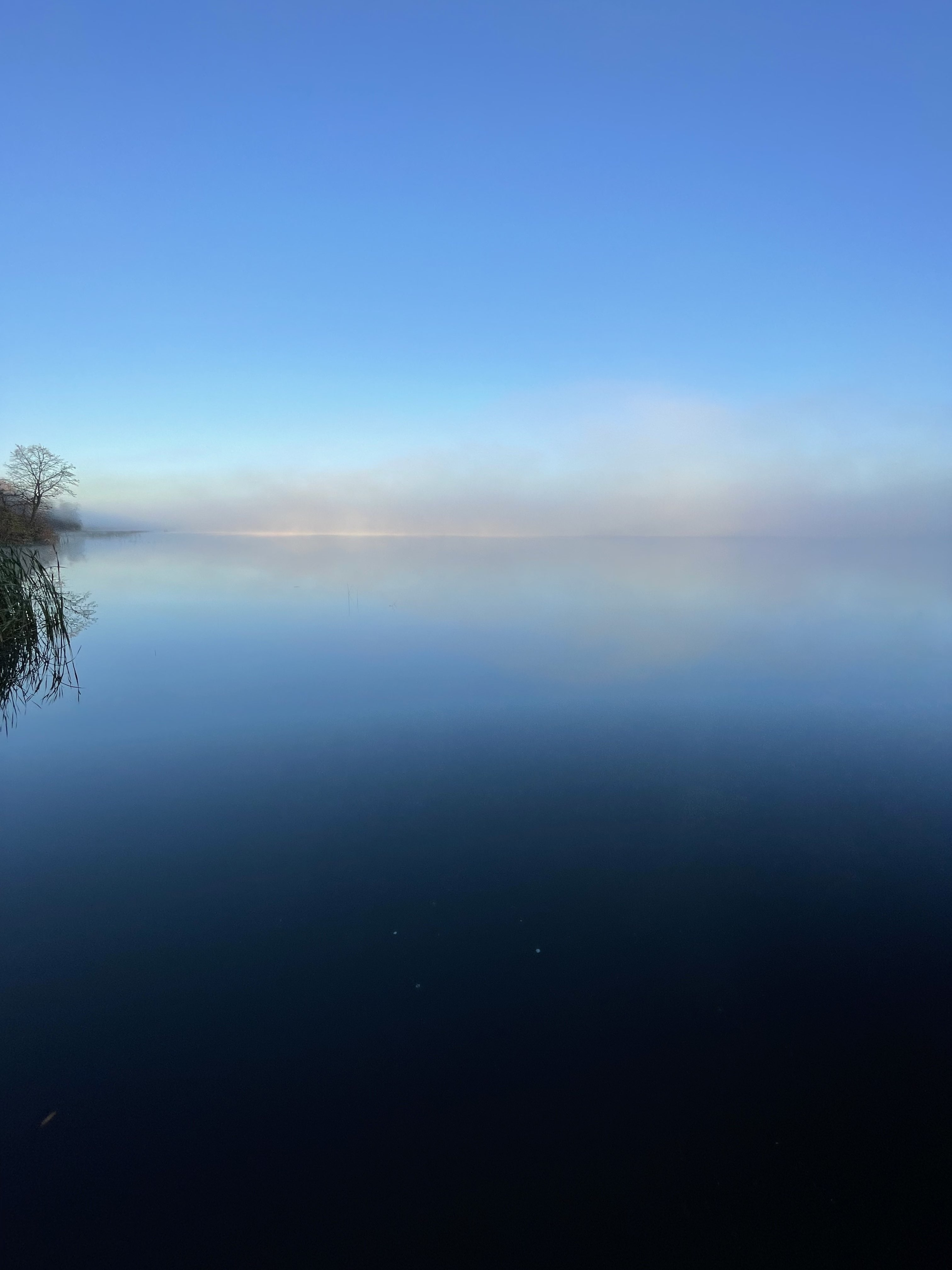
