= Microwave enhanced electrochemistry =

Microwave radiation was applied in electrochemical methods in 1998 when Frank Marken and Richard G. Compton in Oxford placed a piece of platinum wire inside a microwave cavity in small electrochemical cell.
