= Marty =

Marty may refer to:

== Names ==
- Marty (given name), including a list of people and fictional characters, also includes stage names
- Marty (surname), a list of people

== Places in the United States ==
- Marty, Minnesota, an unincorporated community
- Marty, South Dakota, a census-designated place

== Arts and entertainment ==
- "Marty" (The Philco Television Playhouse), a 1953 teleplay by Paddy Chayefsky
- Marty (film), a 1955 American film based on the teleplay
- Marty (musical), a 2003 musical version of the film
- Marty (TV series), a 1968–1969 British television comedy series starring Marty Feldman
- "Marty", a song by the band Five Iron Frenzy
- Marty Supreme (film), a 2025 film by Josh Safdie

== Other uses ==
- Martin County Public Transit, a public transit agency in Florida
- Tropical Storm Marty (disambiguation), various storms and hurricanes
- USS W. F. Marty, a patrol vessel in United States Navy service from 1917 to 1918
- FM Towns Marty, a Japanese videogame console
- Marty (robot), a robotic supermarket assistant used by The Giant Company

== See also ==
- Martí (disambiguation)
- Morty
