= Marty, Minnesota =

Marty
- Unincorporated community
- Location within Minnesota Location within the United States
- Coordinates: 45°23′59″N 94°19′58″W
- Country: United States
- State: Minnesota
- County: Stearns
- Township: Maine Prairie Township
- Elevation: 1,135 ft (346 m)
- Time zone: UTC-6 (Central (CST))
  - Summer (DST): UTC-5 (CDT)
- ZIP code: 55353
- Area code: 320
- GNIS feature ID: 647579

Marty is an unincorporated community in Maine Prairie Township, Stearns County, Minnesota, United States. The community is located near the junction of Stearns County Roads 8 and 48. Nearby places include Kimball and Rockville. County Road 141 is also in the immediate area. Centered less than a mile from Pearl Lake, Marty is home to a lodge bearing the same name, Lund's Lakeside resort, at the junction of 8 and 141, The catholic school in the community closed down and is now used for events
