= MARTI Electronics =

American electronics company

Marti Electronics (stylized all-caps), a division of Broadcast Electronics, manufactures RF Remote Pick-Up equipment for the broadcast industry. Marti has been supplying such hardware since 1960 with few competitors in its very vertical market. Because this equipment was so ubiquitous for so many years, the words "Marti" and "RPU" have become almost synonymous among broadcast engineers. Originally independently owned by George Marti, he later sold it to Broadcast Electronics in 1994.

Marti is headquartered in Quincy, Illinois.
