= Marty (robot) =

Marty is a machine used at grocery stores in the United States to monitor the floors for spills. Marty can tell the difference between a display rack and a human.

In 2019, Marty began to be used at over 100 Stop & Shop stores in Massachusetts.
