= Remote pickup unit =

Type of radio system

A remote pickup unit (RPU) is a radio system using special radio frequencies set aside for electronic news-gathering (ENG) and remote broadcasting. It can also be used for other types of point-to-point radio links.

An RPU is used to send program material from a remote location to the broadcast station or network. Usually these systems use specialized high audio fidelity radio equipment. One manufacturer, Marti, was best known for manufacturing remote pickup equipment, so much so that the name is usually used to refer to a remote pickup unit regardless of who the actual equipment manufacturer actually is.

Today much of the remote broadcast use digital audio system fed over ISDN telephone lines. This method is favored because of reliability of telephone lines versus a radio link back to the station. The radio RPU remains much more favored for ENG however, because of its flexibility.
