= Dolors Martí Domènech =

Spanish politician (1901–1970)

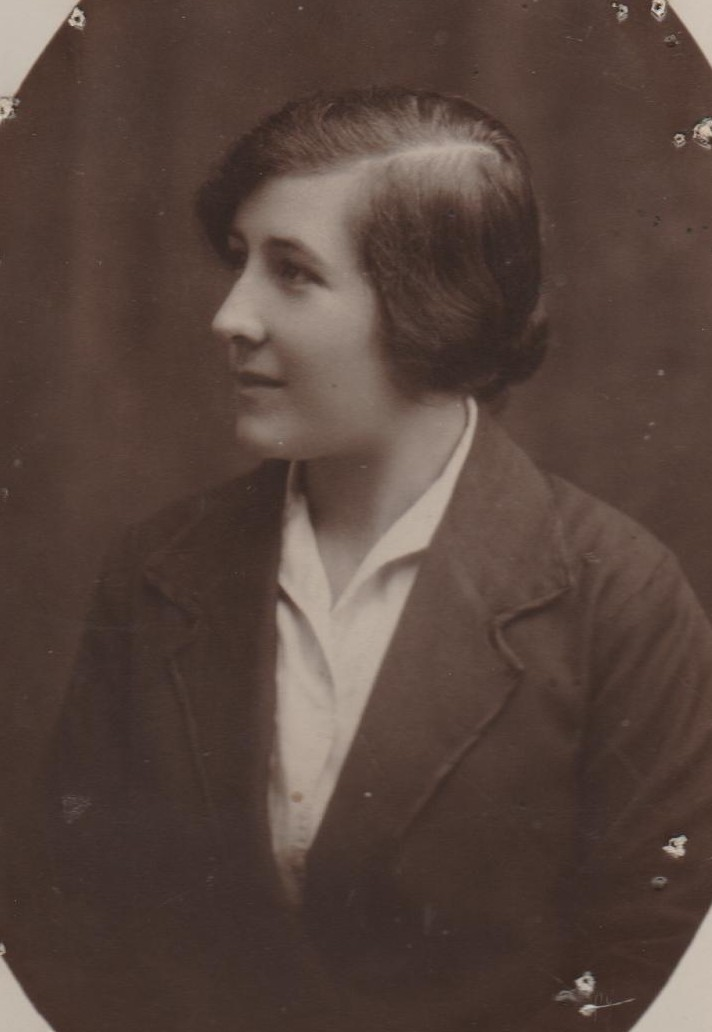
- Domènech c. 1930
- Born: 1901; Tivissa, Spain
- Died: 1970 (aged 68–69); Bordeaux, France

Dolors Martí Domènech (1901–1970) was the only woman to have a public career and to hold a position of political responsibility with the Catalan Republican government in Tarragona, Spain in the 1930s. She died in exile in France in 1970.

== Early life and education ==
Dolors Martí Domènech was born in Tivissa in the Province de Tarragona, Spain in 1901, the daughter of Juliana Domènech Tost and Jaume Martí Jardí, a farmer. She was the youngest of ten siblings, six of whom died of diphtheria in childhood.

Her father was a member of the Tivissa Republican Committee, led by Marcelino Domingo, a politician from Tortosa. Dolors' father was a great influence on her, and by the age of 13 she was accompanying him to political meetings. She showed an early talent for writing poetry (in both Catalan and Spanish) as well as political speeches and proclamations.

At the age of twenty, shortly after her father's death, she began working in a blinds factory near Tivissa, and later moved to Barcelona. She married teacher Adrià Broseta Merecenciano, of Valencia, and they moved around for his job, living in Cornellà de Llobregat, Vila-seca, Salomó, Renau and Tarragone). The couple had two children, Ferran and Maria Lluïsa Broseta Martí.

== The Second Spanish Republic ==
The proclamation of the Second Spanish Republic took place while the Broseta Martí family was living in Reus. Shortly afterwards, they moved to Vila-seca, where Dolors Martí Domènech joined the Spanish Socialist Workers' Party, successfully taking part as a speaker in the 1933 general election.

When her husband was transferred to Salomó, Dolors Martí Domènech set up the Women's Group of the Spanish Socialist Workers' Party (Agrupació Femenina del Partit Socialista Obrer Espanyol, PSOE) and developed significant trade union activity within the Unión General de Trabajadores (General Workers Union, UGT), which led to conflict and confrontations with the locals.

Shortly after the events of 6 October 1934, her husband was transferred to Renau, Tarragona, a village with a population of 82 people, and advised Martí Domènech to stay away from political conflicts and to go to Barcelona to train as a midwife instead.

Martí Domènech began the preparatory courses for this training, but didn't continue with it as she wanted to fulfil her responsibilities as a mother and wife alongside her political interests. The parliamentary elections of 16 February 1936 resulted in a victory for the left-wing parties and the Spanish Popular Front, which led her to redouble her political passions.

== The Spanish Civil War ==
The Spanish Civil War broke out in mid-July 1936, by which time Martí Domènech had rejoined her husband. In Renau, she intervened when a Republican militia arrived to clear the village of suspected Nationalist faction supporters. Due to her intervention, no one was killed, and the church was not burnt down, which did happen elsewhere. On 15 August 1936, her husband decided to take their family to Llíria in Province of Valencia, but at the end of September, Martí Domènech returned to Tarragona with her children, as she wanted to be more than a spectator to political events. She contacted David Valle Peña and Josep Catalán, leaders of the Unified Socialist Party of Catalonia (PSUC) and the General Workers Union (UGT), who recruited her as a speaker in the campaigns for the Republic. Her husband soon returned to teach in Tarragona.

During the May Days protests in 1937, Martí Domènech was secretary of the Unified Socialist Party of Catalonia (PSUC). She protested against the shootings which took place on the La Rambla street in Barcelona, and helped to look after the wounded at the General Workers Union headquarters.

On 4 November 1937, Dolors Martí Domènech was nominated as a Delegate to the government's Departament d'Economia de la Regió III de Tarragona, which covered the areas of Alt Camp, Alt Penedès, Baix Penedès, Garraf et Tarragonès, with a population of almost 175,000 inhabitants. During the months she held this post, she had to deal with major problems arising from the bombings of towns and cities, which were a regular occurrence during the Spanish Civil War. She grappled with the supply problems caused by the scarcity of raw materials and the destruction of factories due to the bombings. Part of her role involved helping to organise the supply chains within the collectivisation implemented by the Republicans in the early months of the Civil War.

== Exile ==
Two days before the occupation of Tarragona by Franco's Nationalist faction army, the Broseta-Martí family went into exile. As soon as they arrived in France, her husband was taken to Argelès-sur-Mer and then to the Bram concentration camp, and Dolors Martí Domènech and her children were transferred to Méry-sur-Seine. They would not see each other again for a year.

Once reunited, the family managed to get to Bordeaux, with the aim of embarking for Mexico, but the planned boat never arrived. They stayed in Bordeaux, where her husband found work at the Mérignac submarine base.

During the German occupation of France, Dolors Martí Domènech managed to maintain contact with her Unified Socialist Party of Catalonia comrades. The French police arrested her for taking in a Communist who had escaped from a police station.

== Post War ==
After the end of the Second World War, she hoped to return to Catalonia to play a political role in her native country, mistakenly believing that Franco's regime would not be supported by the Allies of World War II. However, her support of the Spanish Communist politician, journalist and writer Joan Comorera led to accusations of deviationism. She was disqualified from holding party office and finally expelled from the Unified Socialist Party of Catalonia on 27 October 1946.

She returned to Spain only once, in 1968, on a trip to Reus to say goodbye to her dying sister.

Dolors Martí Domènech lived in Bordeaux until her death in 1970 at the age of 69.

== Commemoration ==
The Historical Memory Law of 2007 finally granted official recognition to the victims of the Francoist Spanish dictatorship. Years later, Tarragona City Council, committed to remembrance and gender equality, decided to name one of the city's streets after Dolors Martí Domènech and to consider the names of other emblematic women in the future.
