= Reciprocity =

Reciprocity may refer to:

== Law and trade ==
- Reciprocity (Canadian politics), free trade with the United States of America
  - Reciprocal trade agreement, entered into in order to reduce (or eliminate) tariffs, quotas and other trade restrictions on items traded between the signatories
- Interstate reciprocity, recognition of sibling federated states' laws:
  - In the United States specifically:
    - Full Faith and Credit Clause, which provides for it
    - Concealed carry reciprocity
  - Occupational licensing, which in some jurisdictions provides for it
- Traffic violations reciprocity where non-resident drivers are treated like residents
- Quid pro quo, a legal concept of the exchange of good or services, each having value

== Social sciences and humanities ==
- Norm of reciprocity, social norm of in-kind responses to the behavior of others
- Reciprocity (cultural anthropology), way of defining people's informal exchange of goods and labour
- Reciprocity (evolution), mechanisms for the evolution of cooperation
- Reciprocity (international relations), principle that favours, benefits, or penalties that are granted by one state to the citizens or legal entities of another, should be returned in kind
- Reciprocity (social and political philosophy), concept of reciprocity as in-kind positive or negative responses for the actions of others
- Reciprocity (social psychology), in-kind positively or negatively connoted responses of individuals towards the actions of others
- Ethic of reciprocity (the Golden Rule), that one should treat others as one would like others to treat oneself
- Serial reciprocity, in which the benefactor of a gift or service will in turn provide benefits to a third party

== Physical sciences and engineering ==
- Reciprocity (engineering), used in the analysis of structures and to resolve complex load conditions
- Reciprocity (electromagnetism), theorems relating sources and the resulting fields in classical electromagnetism
- Reciprocity (electrical networks), reciprocity theorem as it relates to current and voltage in electrical networks
- Reciprocity (network science), measures the tendency of vertex pairs to form mutual connections between each other
- Reciprocity (optoelectronic), a diode under illumination to the photon emission of the same diode under applied voltage
- Reciprocity (photography), the relationship between the intensity of the light and duration of the exposure that result in identical exposure
- Reciprocity of twist and wrench, in screw theory
- Reciprocity theorem (disambiguation), several unrelated results
- Reciprocity of antenna transmitting and receiving characteristics
- Helmholtz reciprocity, linear propagation.

== Mathematics ==
- Reciprocity law (law of reciprocity) in mathematics, including
  - Quadratic reciprocity, a fundamental result in number theory
  - Cubic reciprocity, theorems that state conditions under which the congruence x^{3} ≡ p (mod q) is solvable
  - Quartic reciprocity, a collection of theorems in elementary and algebraic number theory that state conditions under which the congruence x^{4} ≡ p (mod q) is solvable
  - Artin reciprocity law, a general theorem in number theory that provided a partial solution to Hilbert's ninth problem
  - Reciprocity relation or exact differential, a mathematical differential of the form dQ, for some differentiable function Q
- Weil reciprocity law
- Reciprocal polynomials, the coefficients of the remainder polynomial are the bits of the CRC
- Reciprocal square root
- Reciprocity (projective geometry), a collineation from a projective space onto its dual space, taking points to hyperplanes (and vice versa) and preserving incidence
- Frobenius reciprocity, from group representation theory
- Reciprocity law for Dedekind sums
- Stanley's reciprocity theorem, states that a certain functional equation is satisfied by the generating function of any rational cone and the generating function of the cone's interior
- Hermite reciprocity for invariants of binary forms.

== Other ==
- Reciprocity (Fringe), a 2011 episode of the television series Fringe
- Rural Municipality of Reciprocity No. 32, Saskatchewan, Canada
- "Reciprocity", a song by Loudon Wainwright III from his 1976 album T Shirt

== See also ==
- Reciprocal (disambiguation)
- Reciprocation (disambiguation)
- Reciprocity Treaty (disambiguation)
- Reciprocal altruism between individuals of different species
- Meeting of the minds in contract law, sometimes called reciprocity
- Tit for tat
