= Circulator (disambiguation) =

A circulator is a passive radio-frequency electronic device in which a signal entering any port is transmitted to the next port (only) in rotation.

Circulator may also refer to:

- Passive radio frequency and microwave circulator, a device that utilizes magnetized ferrite to provide the circulator function
- Active radio frequency and microwave circulator, a circulator that includes semiconductors to provide the circulator function and requires a power source
- Optical circulator, the optical equivalent of a conventional circulator
- Acoustic circulator, a non-reciprocal audio device
- Circulator pump, a pump that is used to circulate gases, liquids, or slurries in a closed circuit
- Downtown circulator, a road or bus system that distributes traffic or people through a downtown area
  - DC Circulator, a bus system in Washington, D.C.
