= Reciprocity theorem =

Reciprocity theorem may refer to:

- Quadratic reciprocity, a theorem about modular arithmetic
  - Cubic reciprocity
  - Quartic reciprocity
  - Artin reciprocity
  - Weil reciprocity for algebraic curves
- Frobenius reciprocity theorem for group representations
- Stanley's reciprocity theorem for generating functions
- Reciprocity (engineering), theorems relating signals and the resulting responses
  - including Reciprocity (electrical networks), a theorem relating voltages and currents in a network
- Reciprocity (electromagnetism), theorems relating sources and the resulting fields in classical electromagnetism
- Tellegen's theorem, a theorem about the transfer function of passive networks
- Reciprocity law for Dedekind sums
- Betti's theorem in linear elasticity
- The Triple Product rule, a formula relating the partial derivatives of three independent variables, often used in thermodynamics

== See also ==
- Reciprocity (disambiguation)
