= Mutuality =

Mutuality can refer to:

- Mutualism (disambiguation)
- Reciprocity (disambiguation)
- The mutual intention of parties to a contract to create binding legal relations
- The mutuality doctrine of collateral estoppel
