= Type W =

Type W or W-type may refer to:

- the Handley Page Type W, a biplane
- W engine types
- Renault Type W engine types
- W-types, in type theory
- a W-type star
- a W-type planet in binary star systems
- a Victorian Railways W type carriage
- W-type ferrite, a type of ceramic material

== See also ==
- W-class destroyer
