= Isolator (microwave) =

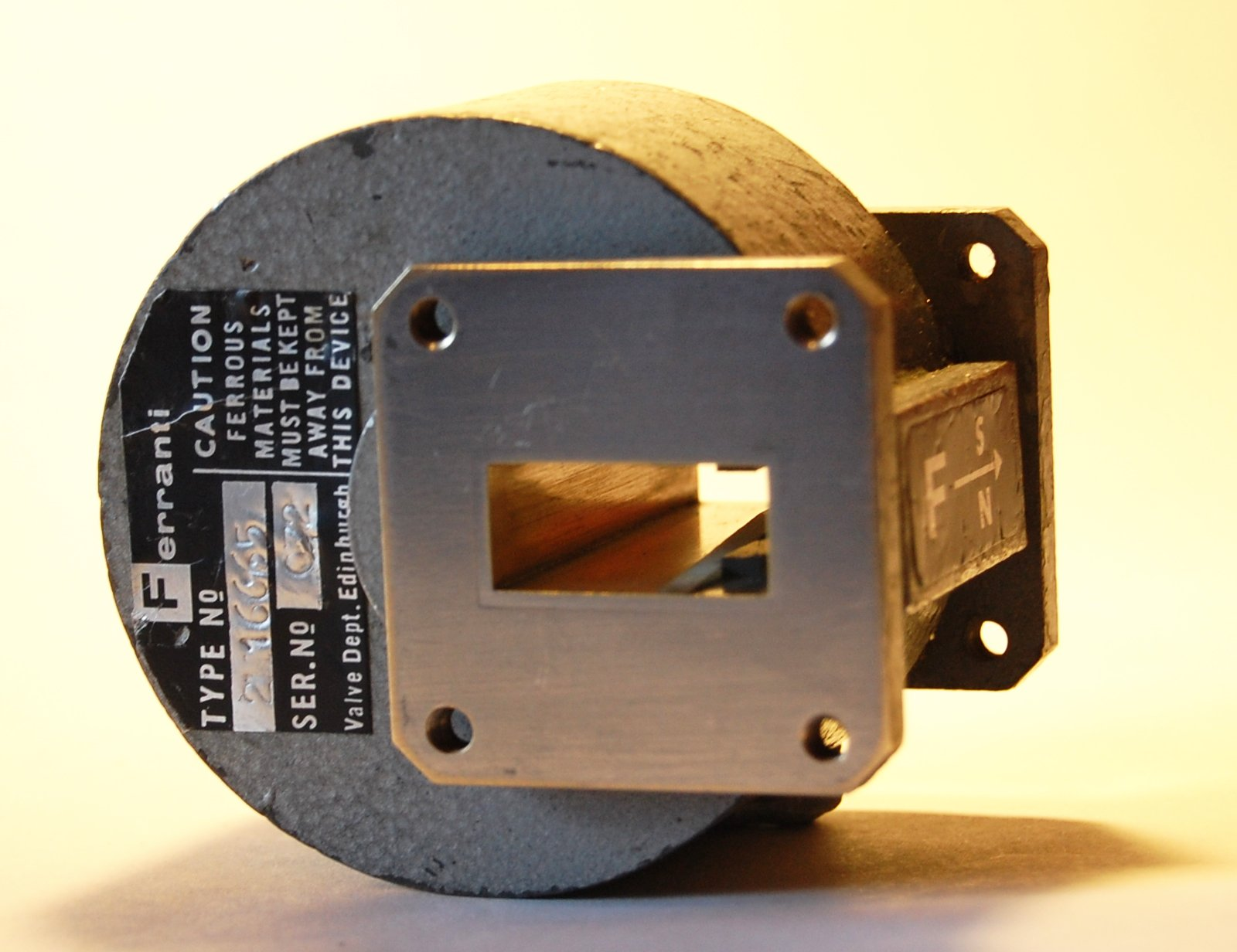
Resonance absorption isolator consisting of WG16 waveguide containing two strips of ferrite (black rectangle near right edge of each broad wall), which are biased by a horseshoe permanent magnet external to the guide. Transmission direction is indicated by an arrow on the label on the right

An isolator is a two-port device that transmits microwave or radio frequency power in one direction only. The non-reciprocity observed in these devices usually comes from the interaction between the propagating wave and the material, which can be different with respect to the direction of propagation.

It is used to shield equipment on its input side, from the effects of conditions on its output side; for example, to prevent a microwave source being detuned by a mismatched load.

== Non-reciprocity ==
An isolator is a non-reciprocal device, with a non-symmetric scattering matrix. An ideal isolator transmits all the power entering port 1 to port 2, while absorbing all the power entering port 2, so that to within a phase-factor its S-matrix is

$$S = \begin{pmatrix}
0 & 0 \\
1 & 0
\end{pmatrix}$$

To achieve non-reciprocity, an isolator must necessarily incorporate a non-reciprocal material. At microwave frequencies, this material is usually a ferrite which is biased by a static magnetic field but can be a self-biased material. The ferrite is positioned within the isolator such that the microwave signal presents it with a rotating magnetic field, with the rotation axis aligned with the direction of the static bias field. The behaviour of the ferrite depends on the sense of rotation with respect to the bias field, and hence is different for microwave signals travelling in opposite directions. Depending on the exact operating conditions, the signal travelling in one direction may either be phase-shifted, displaced from the ferrite or absorbed.

== Types ==
Resonance isolator in rectangular waveguide topology. The forward magnetic field (solid line) is circularly polarized in the ferrite slab and FMR absorption is induced therein. The backward field (dashed) is not circularly polarized and flows normally along the guide.

Field-displacement isolator in rectangular waveguide topology. The ferrite slab deforms the electric field so that the forward field is maximal at the border of the ferrite where a resistive sheet has been placed. This sheet decreases the intensity of the electric field. The backward field is minimal at this same place so that it experiences no loss because of the resistive sheet.

Circulator-based isolator. The circulation mechanism induced by the ferrite in the cavity constrains the signal to flow from port 1 to port 2 and from port 2 to port 3. However, the port 3 is connected to a matched load. All the incoming signal is then absorbed and no signal can be emitted from port 3.

Most common types of ferrite-based isolators are classified into four categories: terminated circulators, Faraday rotation isolators, field-displacement isolators, and resonance isolators. In all these kinds of devices, the observed non-reciprocity arises from the wave-material interaction which depends on the direction of propagation.

=== Resonance absorption ===
In this type, the ferrite absorbs energy from the microwave signal travelling in one direction. A suitable rotating magnetic field is found in the dominant TE_{10} mode of rectangular waveguide. The rotating field exists away from the centre-line of the broad wall, over the full height of the guide. However, to allow heat from the absorbed power to be conducted away, the ferrite does not usually extend from one broad-wall to the other, but is limited to a shallow strip on each face. For a given bias field, resonance absorption occurs over a fairly narrow frequency band, but since in practice the bias field is not perfectly uniform throughout the ferrite, the isolator functions over a somewhat wider band.

=== Field displacement ===
This type is superficially very similar to a resonance absorption isolator, but the magnetic biasing differs, and the energy from the backward travelling signal is absorbed in a resistive film or card on one face of the ferrite block rather than within the ferrite itself.

The bias field is weaker than that necessary to cause resonance at the operating frequency, but is instead designed to give the ferrite near-zero permeability for one sense of rotation of the microwave signal field. The bias polarity is such that this special condition arises for the forward signal; the backward signal sees the ferrite as an ordinary dielectric material (with little permeability, as the ferrite is already saturated by the bias field). Consequently, for the electromagnetic field of the forward signal, the ferrite has very low characteristic wave impedance, and the field tends to be excluded from the ferrite. This results in a null of the electric field of the forward signal on the surface of the ferrite where the resistive film is placed. Conversely for the backward signal, the electric field is strong over this surface and so its energy is dissipated in driving current through the film.

In a rectangular waveguide, the ferrite block will typically occupy the full height from one broad-wall to the other, with the resistive film on the side facing the centre-line of the guide.

=== Terminated circulator ===
A circulator is a non-reciprocal three- or four-port device, in which power entering any port is transmitted to the next port in rotation (only). So to within a phase-factor, the scattering matrix for a three-port circulator is

$$S = \begin{pmatrix}
0 & 0 & 1\\
1 & 0 & 0 \\
0 & 1 & 0
\end{pmatrix}$$

A two-port isolator is obtained simply by terminating one of the three ports with a matched load, which absorbs all the power entering it. The biased ferrite is part of the circulator and causes a differential phase-shift for signals travelling in different directions. The bias field is lower than that needed for resonance absorption, and so this type of isolator does not require such a heavy permanent magnet. Because the power is absorbed in an external load, cooling is less of a problem than with a resonance absorption isolator.

=== Faraday rotation isolator ===
Another physical principle useful to design isolators is the Faraday rotation. When a linearly polarized wave propagates through ferrite having a magnetization aligned with the direction of propagation of the wave, the polarization plane will rotate along the propagation axis. This rotation may be used to create microwave devices as isolators, circulators, gyrators, etc. In rectangular waveguide topology, it also requires the implementation of circular waveguide sections which come out of the device plane.

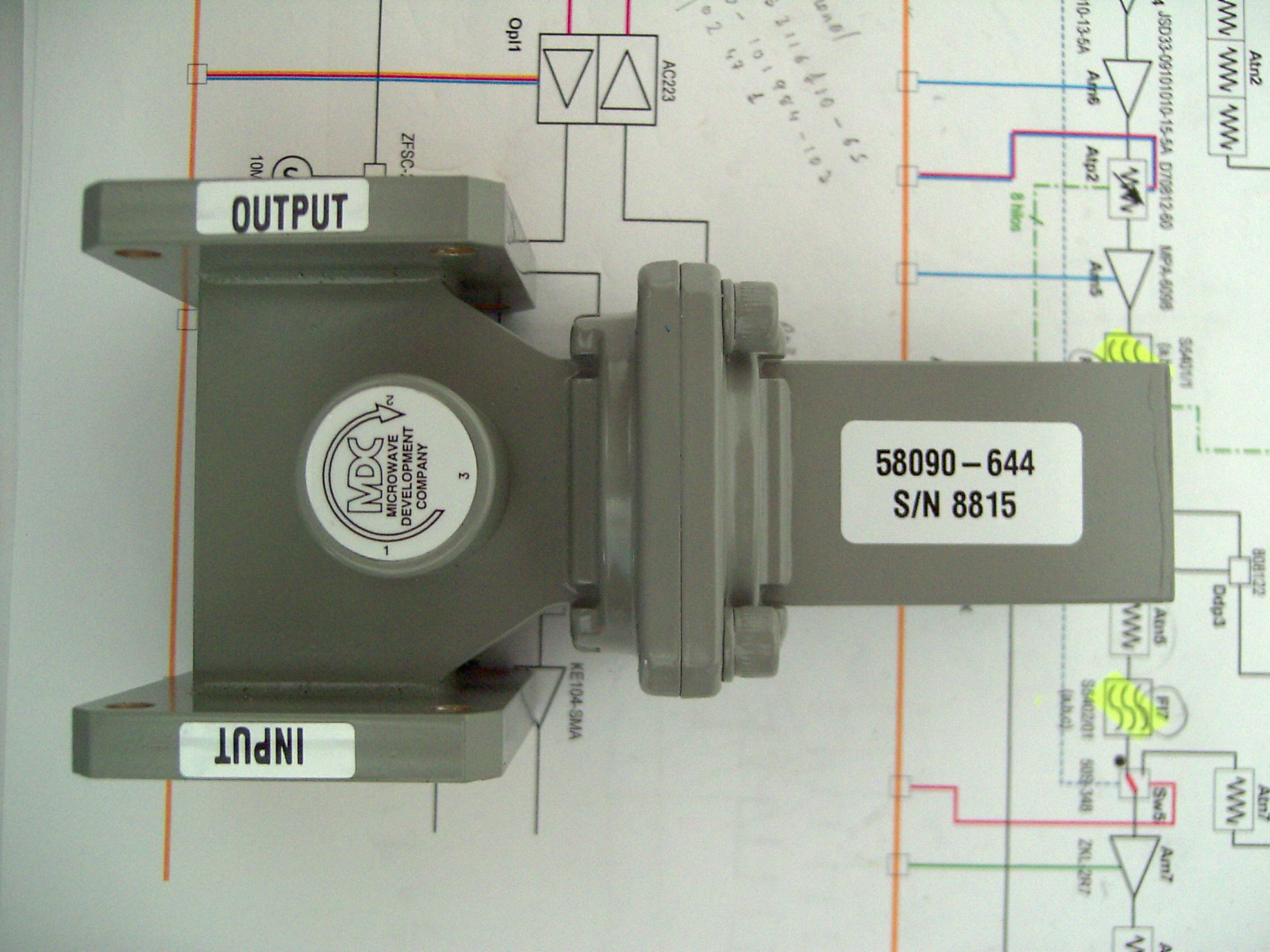
An X band isolator consisting of a waveguide circulator with an external matched load on one port

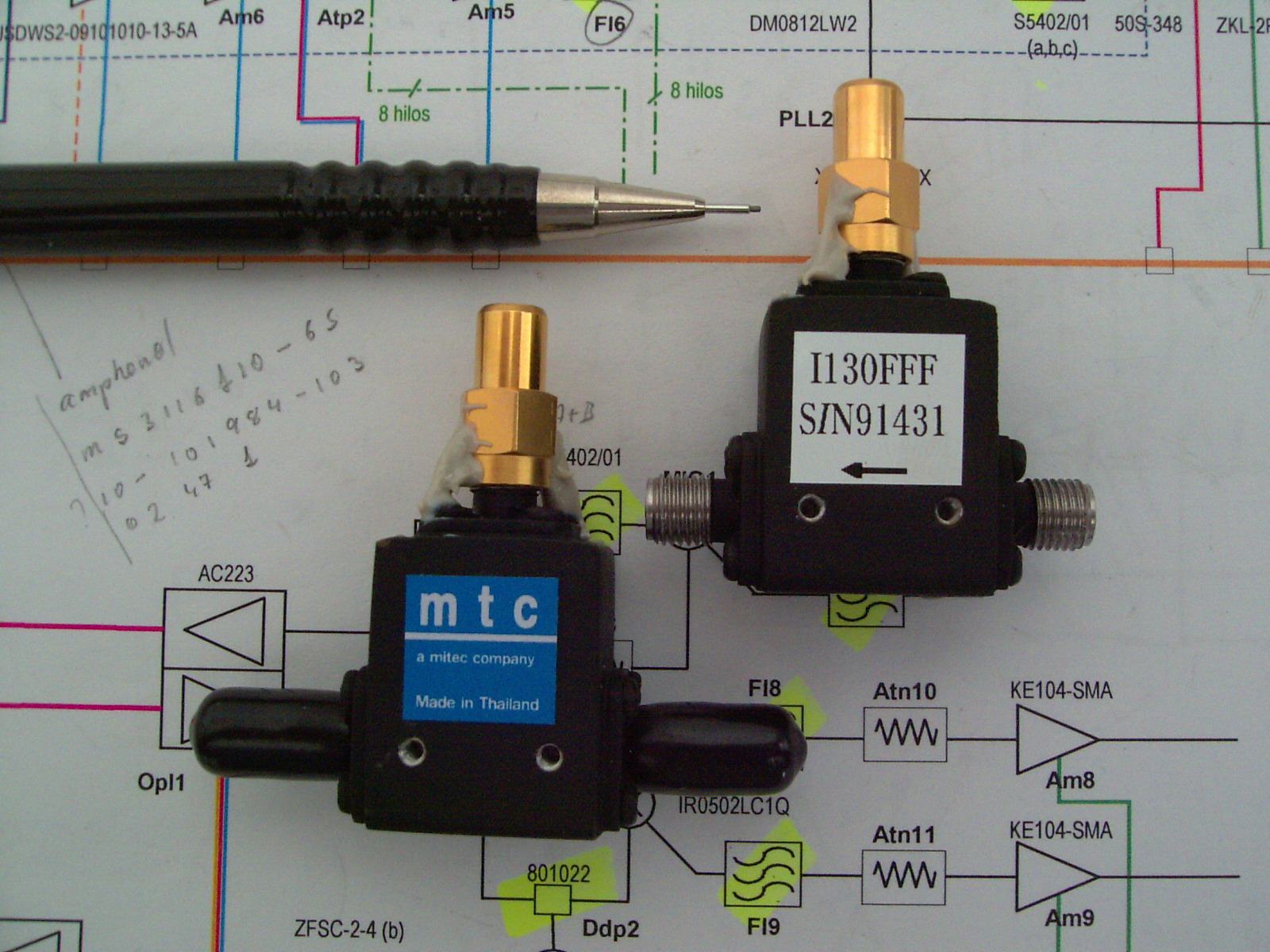
Two isolators each consisting of a coax circulator and a matched load

== See also ==
- Power dividers and directional couplers
- Gyrator
