= Mutualism =

Mutualism may refer to:

- Mutualism (biology), positive interactions between species
- Mutualism (economic theory), associated with Pierre-Joseph Proudhon
- Mutualism (movement), social movement promoting mutual organizations
- Mutualism model of human intelligence

== See also ==
- Mutual (disambiguation)
- Mu'tazilism
