= Reciprocation =

Reciprocation may refer to:

- Reciprocating motion, a type of oscillatory motion, as in the action of a reciprocating saw
- Reciprocation (geometry), an operation with circles that involves transforming each point in plane into its polar line and each line in the plane into its pole
- Reciprocation, application of the reciprocal function, see multiplicative inverse

== See also ==
- Reciprocity (disambiguation)
- Reciprocal (disambiguation)
