= Mutual =

Mutual may refer to:

- Mutual organization, where customers derive a right to profits and votes
- Mutual information, the intersection of multiple information sets
- Mutual insurance, where policyholders have certain "ownership" rights in the organization
- Mutual fund, a professionally managed form of collective investments
- Mutual Film, early American motion picture conglomerate, the producers of some of Charlie Chaplin's greatest comedies
- Mutual Base Ball Club (1857-1871), defunct early baseball team usually referred to as "Mutual" in the standings.
- Mutual Broadcasting System, a defunct U.S. radio network
- Mutual Improvement Association, the name of two youth programs run by the Church of Jesus Christ of Latter-day Saints
- Mutual authentication, used in cryptography
- "Mutual", a 2018 song by Shawn Mendes from Shawn Mendes

Place names

- Mutual, Maryland, a community in the United States
- Mutual, Ohio, a village in the United States
- Mutual, Oklahoma, a town in the United States
- Mutual railway station in Cape Town, South Africa

== See also ==
- Mutualism
- Reciprocal (disambiguation)
