= Reciprocity Treaty =

There have been a number of Reciprocity Treaties, including:

- the Canadian–American Reciprocity Treaty of 1854
- the Reciprocity Treaty of 1875 between the United States and the Hawaiian Kingdom
- the Inter-American Treaty of Reciprocal Assistance of 1947 (also known as the Rio Treaty)

See also;

- Reciprocity (international relations)
