= Reciprocal =

Reciprocal may refer to:

== In mathematics ==
- Multiplicative inverse, in mathematics, the number 1/x, which multiplied by x gives the product 1, also known as a reciprocal
- Reciprocal polynomial, a polynomial obtained from another polynomial by reversing its coefficients
- Reciprocal rule, a technique in calculus for calculating derivatives of reciprocal functions
- Reciprocal spiral, a plane curve
- Reciprocal averaging, a statistical technique for aggregating categorical data

== In science and technology ==
- Reciprocal aircraft heading, 180 degrees (the opposite direction) from a stated heading
- Reciprocal lattice, a basis for the dual space of covectors, in crystallography
- Reciprocal length, a measurement used in science
- Reciprocating engine or piston engine
- Reciprocating oscillation in physical wave theory
- Reciprocal cipher

=== Life sciences and medicine ===
- Hybrid (biology), in genetics, the result of a reciprocal pair of crossings, forming reciprocal hybrids
- Reciprocal altruism, a form of symbiotic relationship in evolutionary biology
- Reciprocal cross, a breeding experiment in genetics
- Sherrington's law of reciprocal innervation in the theory of muscle activation

=== Social sciences ===
- Reciprocal determinism, a theory in psychology

=== Linguistics ===
- Reciprocal construction, a construction in which agent and patient are in a mutual relationship

== In reciprocal relationships ==
- Reciprocal license, a type of software licenses also known as copyleft
- Reciprocal link between two web pages
- Reciprocal obligation, in law, a type of agreement between two individuals
- Reciprocal Public License (RPL), a software license

== See also ==
- Reciprocation (disambiguation)
- Reciprocity (disambiguation)
