= Active circulator =

Active non-reciprocal three-port device

Symbol for a 3-Port Circulator

In electrical engineering, an active circulator is an active non-reciprocal three-port device that couples a microwave or radio-frequency signal only to an adjacent port in the direction of circulation. Other (external) circuitry connects to the circulator ports via transmission lines. An ideal three-port active circulator has the following scattering matrix:

$$S = \begin{pmatrix}
0 & 0 & 1\\
1 & 0 & 0 \\
0 & 1 & 0
\end{pmatrix}$$

An active circulator can be constructed using one of several different technologies. One early technology is the use of transistors as the active devices to perform the non-reciprocal function. Varactor circuits are another technology, relying on a time-varying transmission line structure, driven by a separate pump signal. A third technology utilizes spatiotemporally-modulated rings of coupled resonators. Another design approach relies on staggered commutation and integrated circuit techniques.

Compared to passive (ferrite) circulators, active circulators have the advantages of small size, low mass, and simple integration with other circuitry. System designers must weigh these factors with the disadvantages of active circulators: they require DC power and sometimes a separate pump or clock signal, they can be nonlinear, and can introduce significant noise into the signal path.
