= Hexagonal ferrite =

Hexaferrite

Hexagonal ferrites or hexaferrites are a family of ferrites with hexagonal crystal structure. The most common member is BaFe_{12}O_{19}, also called barium ferrite, BaM, etc. BaM is a strong room-temperature ferrimagnetic material with high anisotropy along the c axis.

All the hexaferrite members are constructed by stacking a few building blocks in a certain order.

== Basic building blocks ==
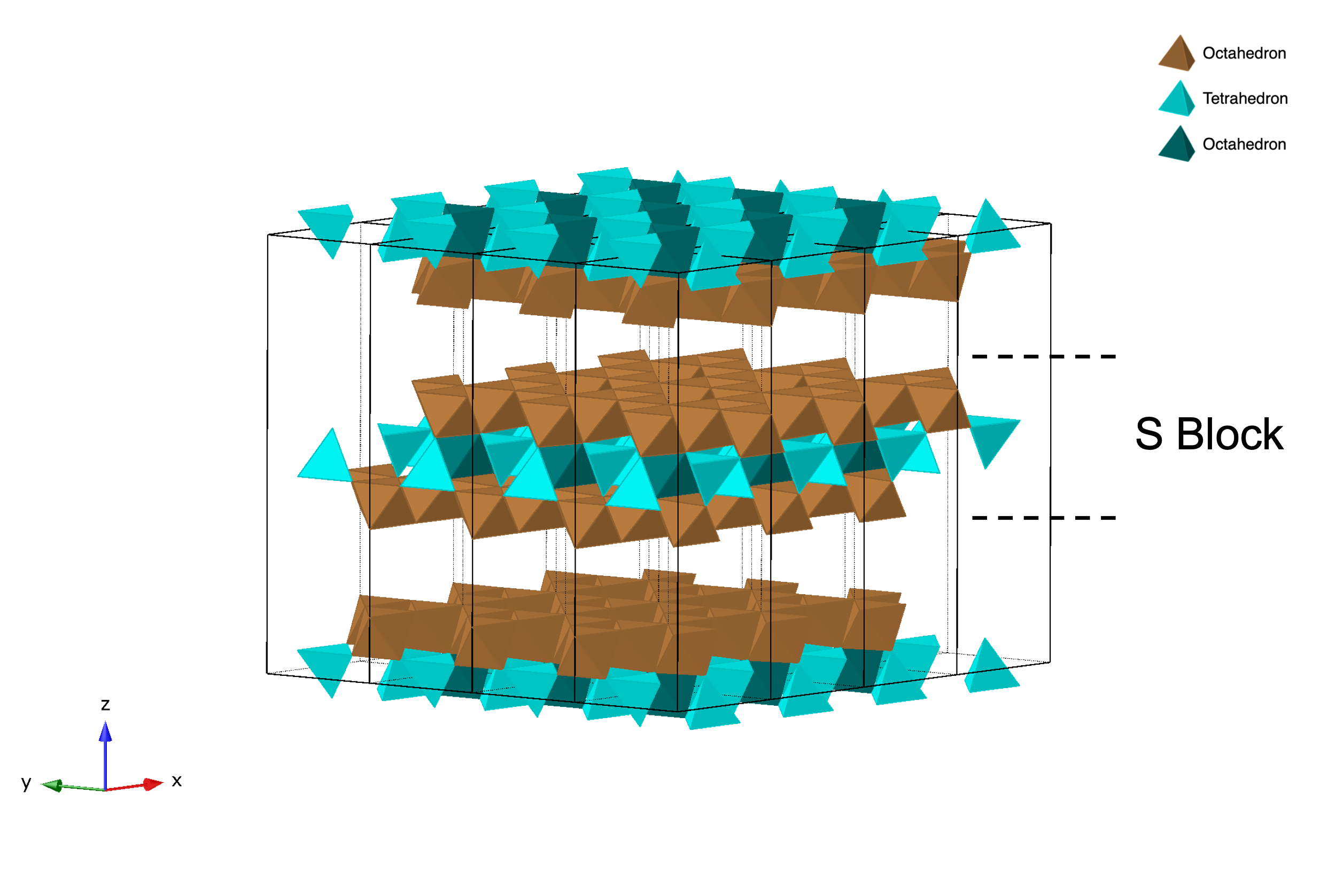
S block structure extracted from an M-type ferrite.

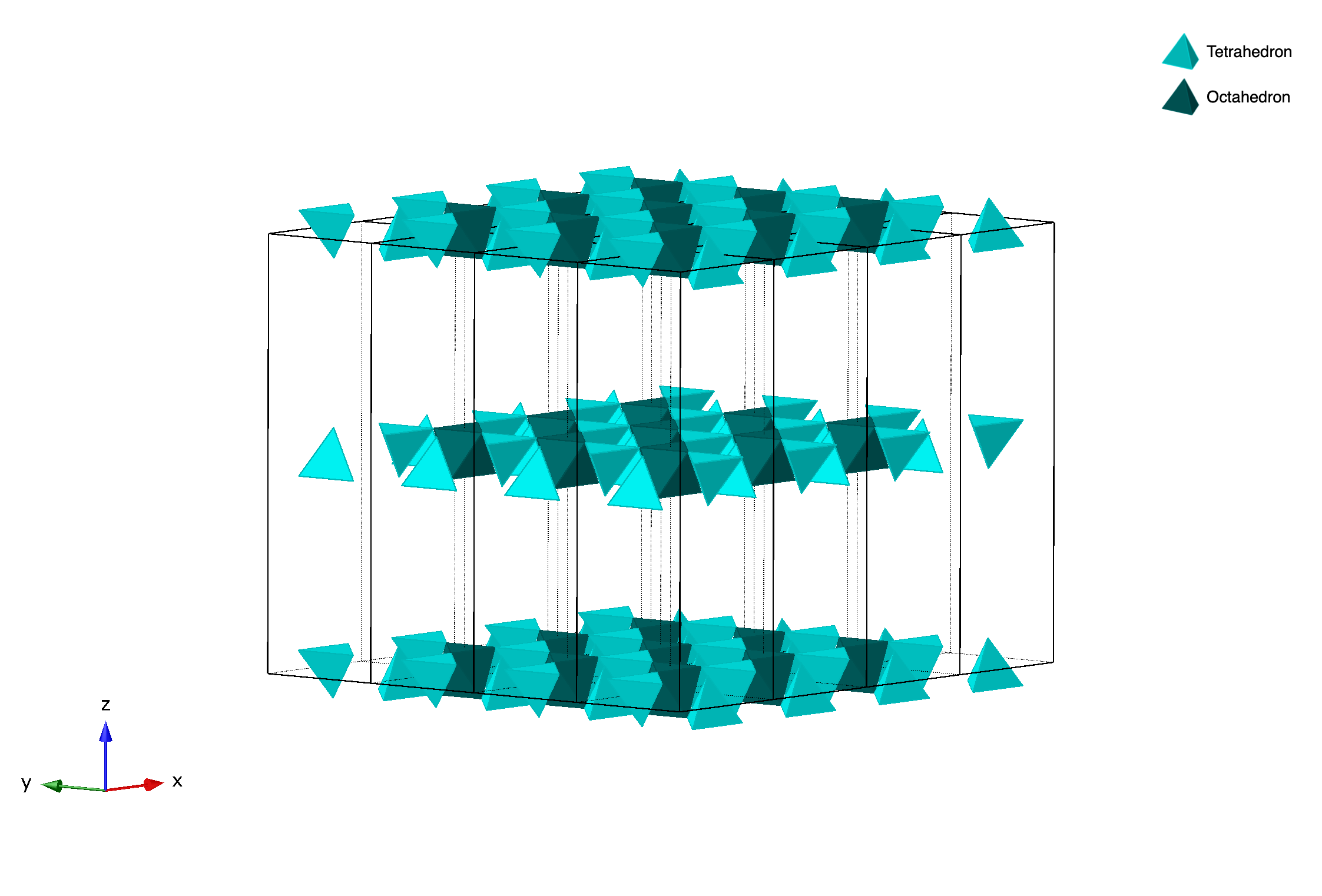
The A layer of S block composed of Me^{S}-centered tetrahedron and Me^{S}-centered octahedron.

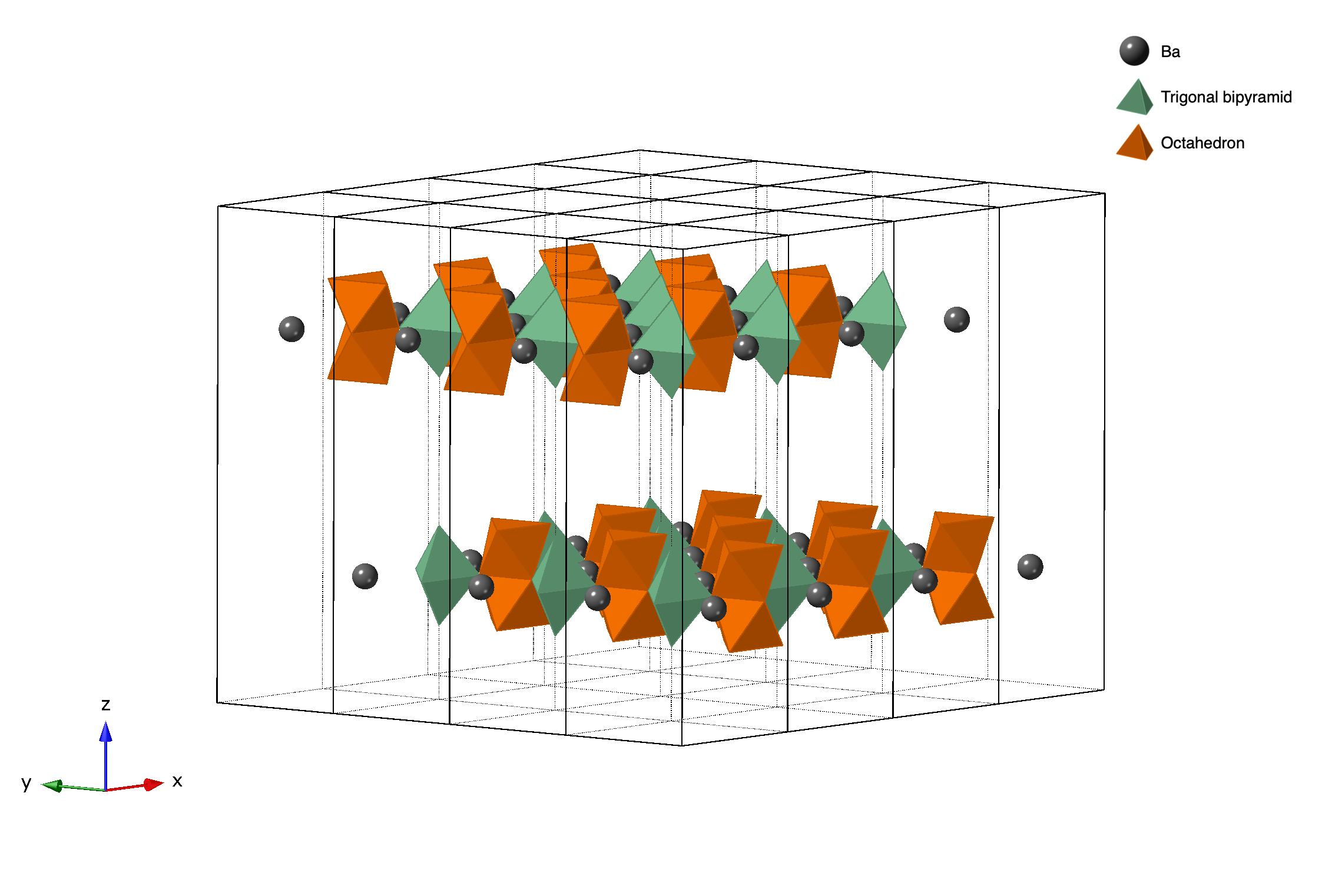
R block structure extracted from an M-type ferrite.

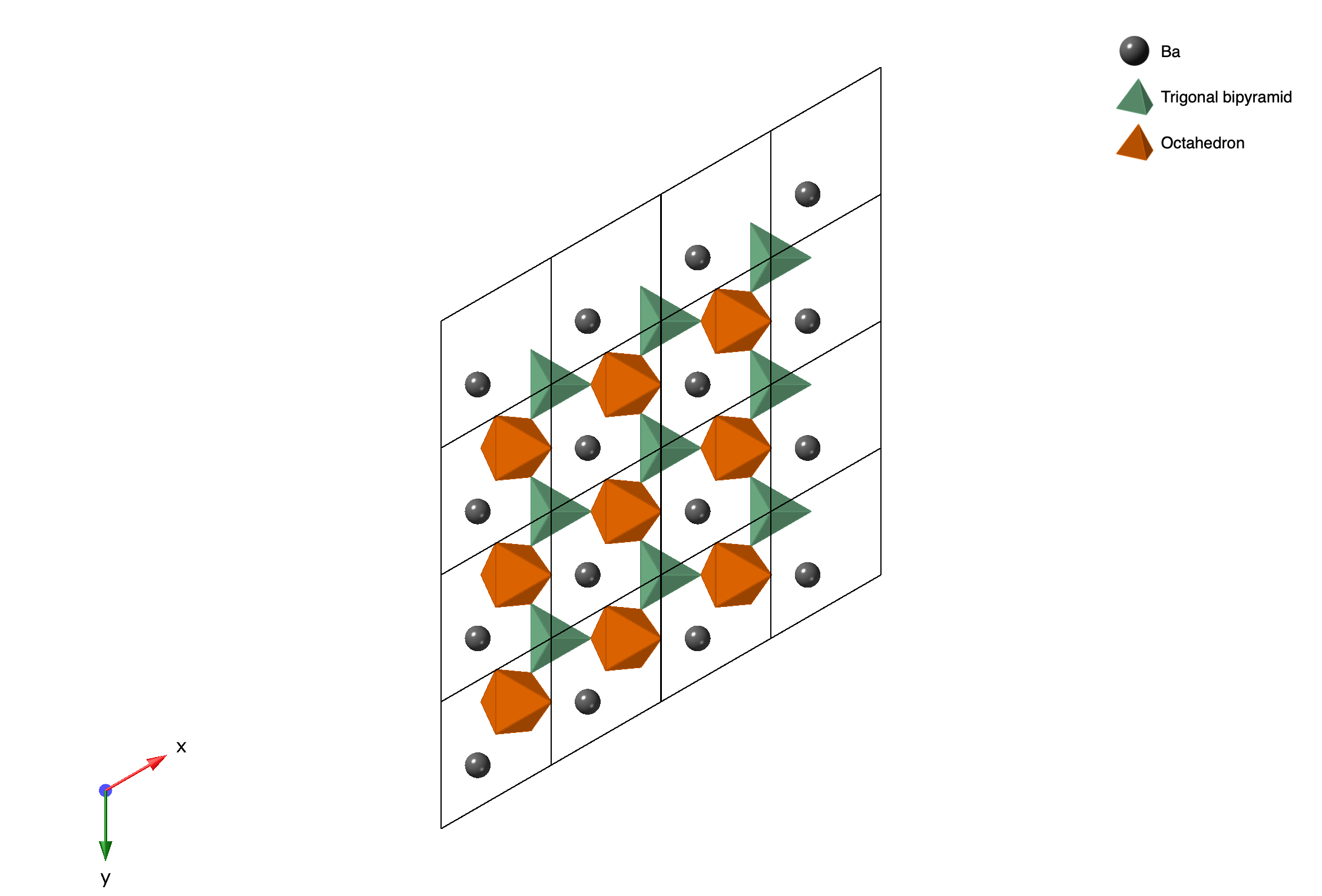
R block structure, view along -c ferrite direction.

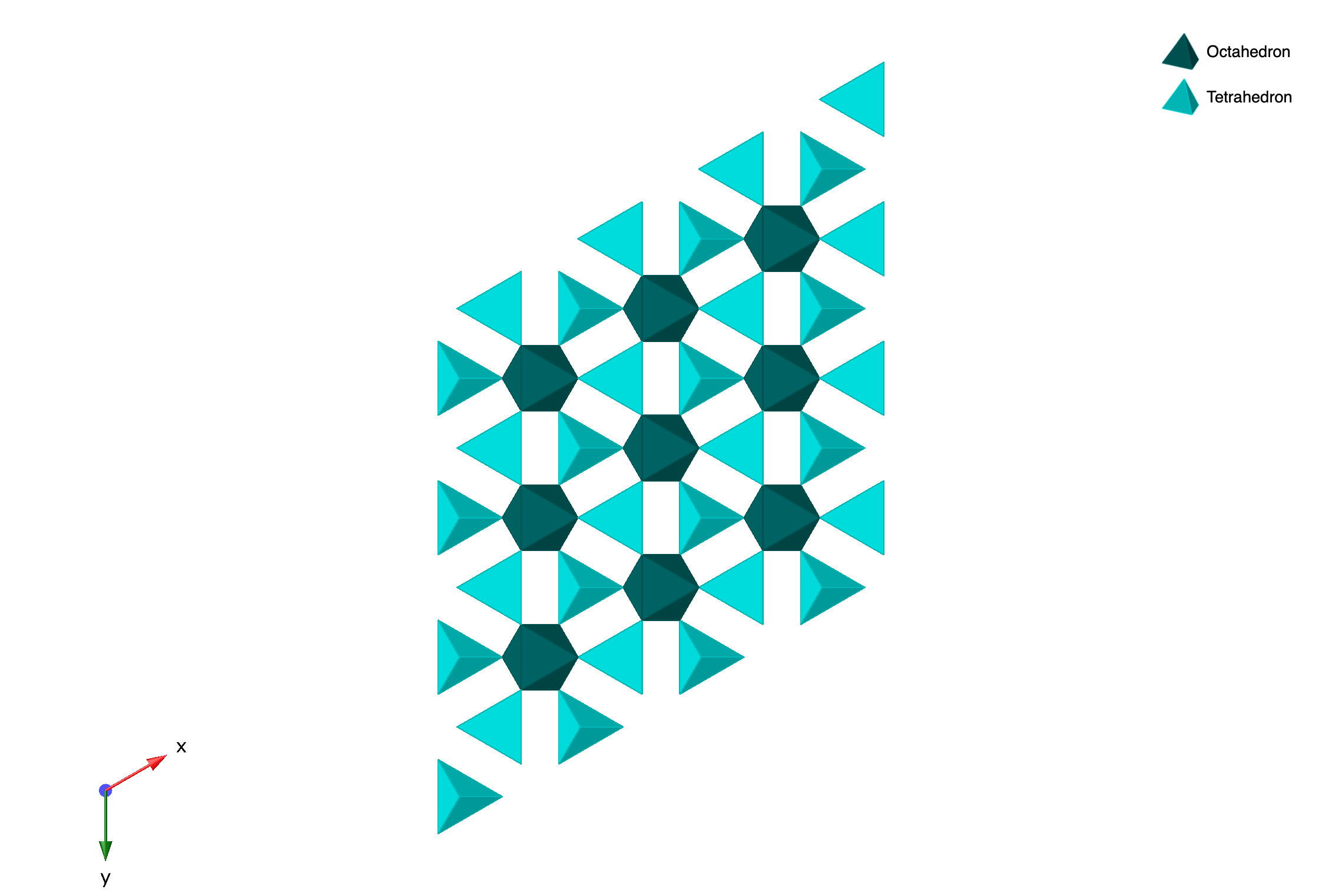
The A layer of S block, view along -c ferrite direction.

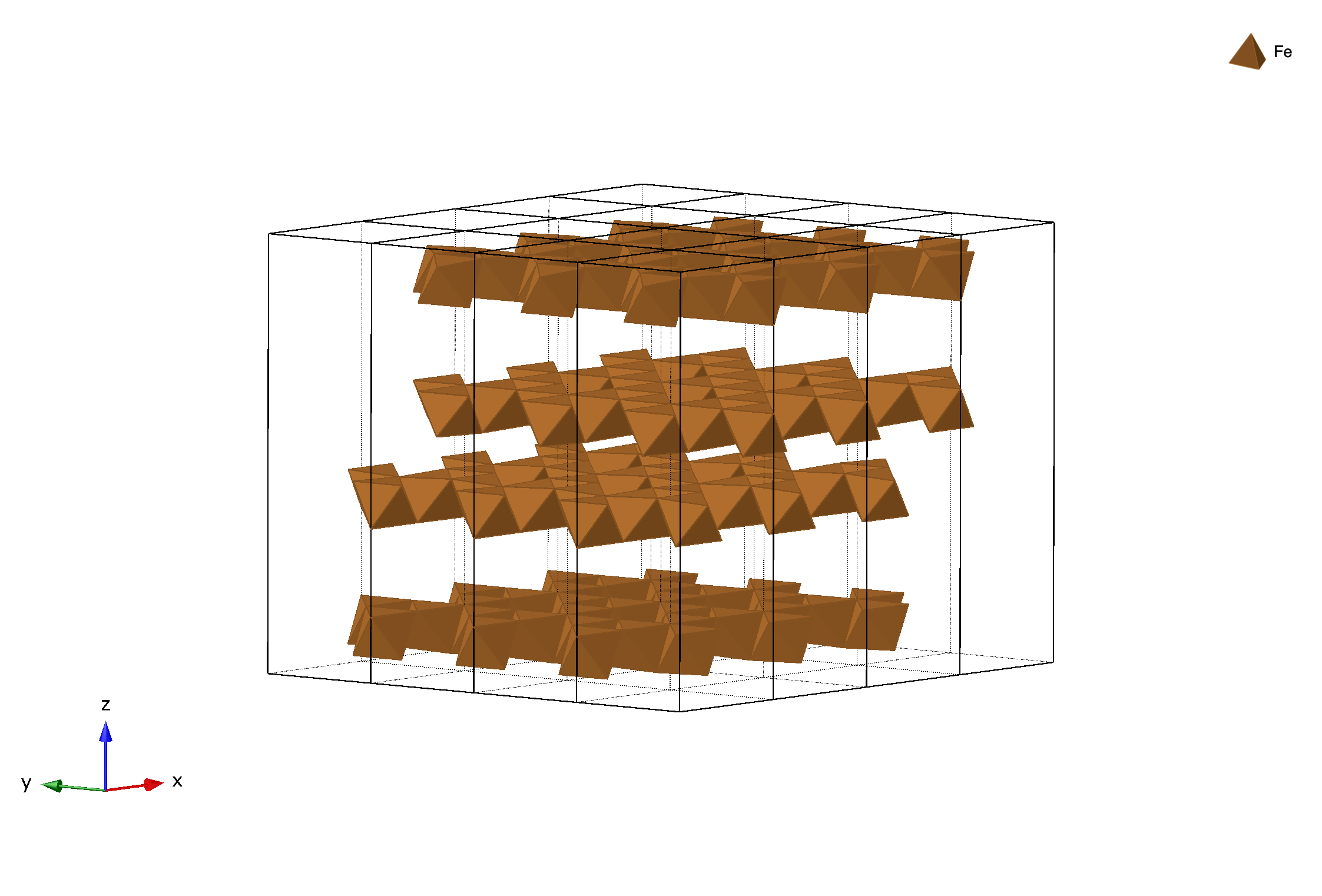
The B layer of S block made up of edge-sharing Me^{S}-centered octahedron.

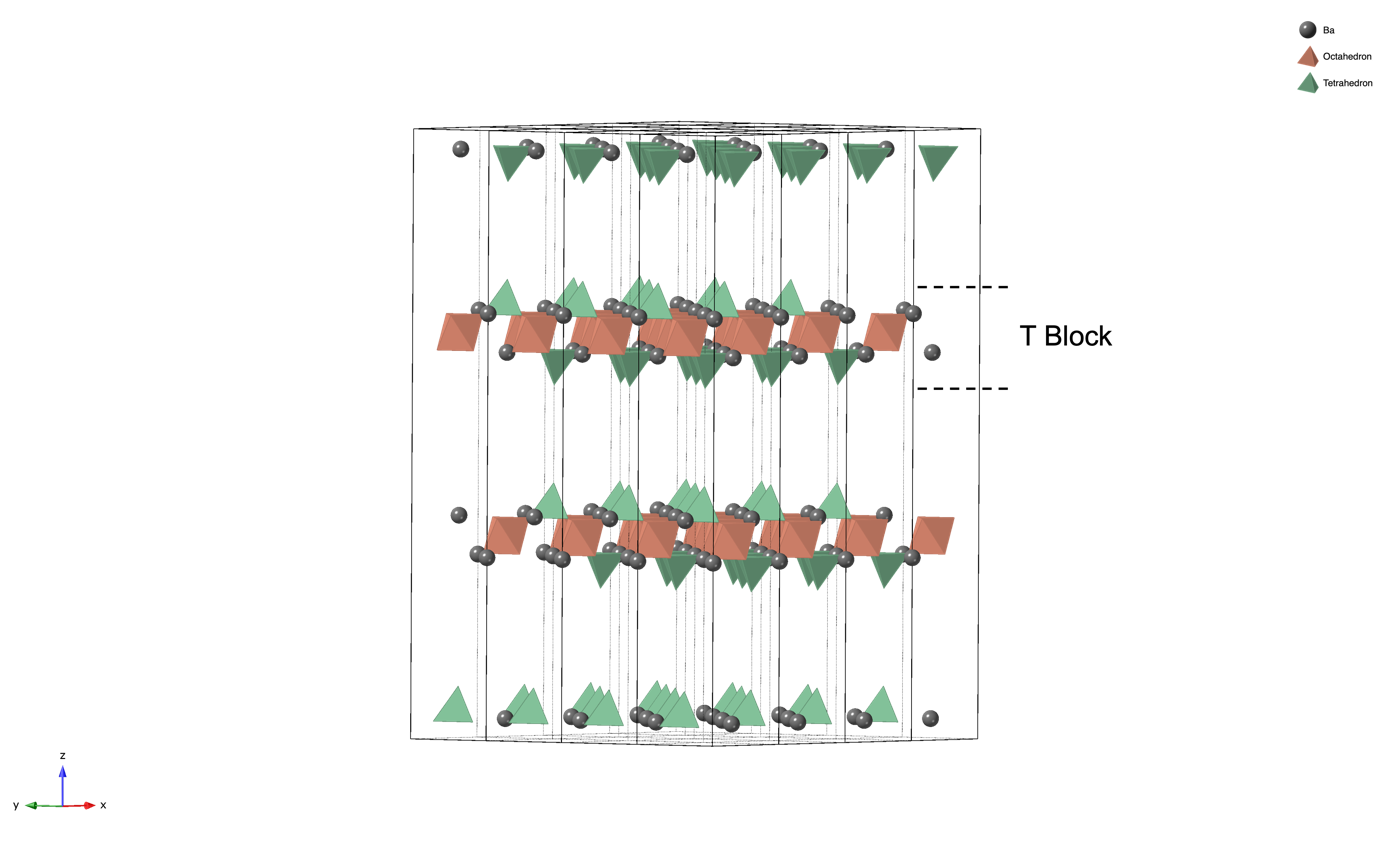
T block structure extracted from a Y-type ferrite.

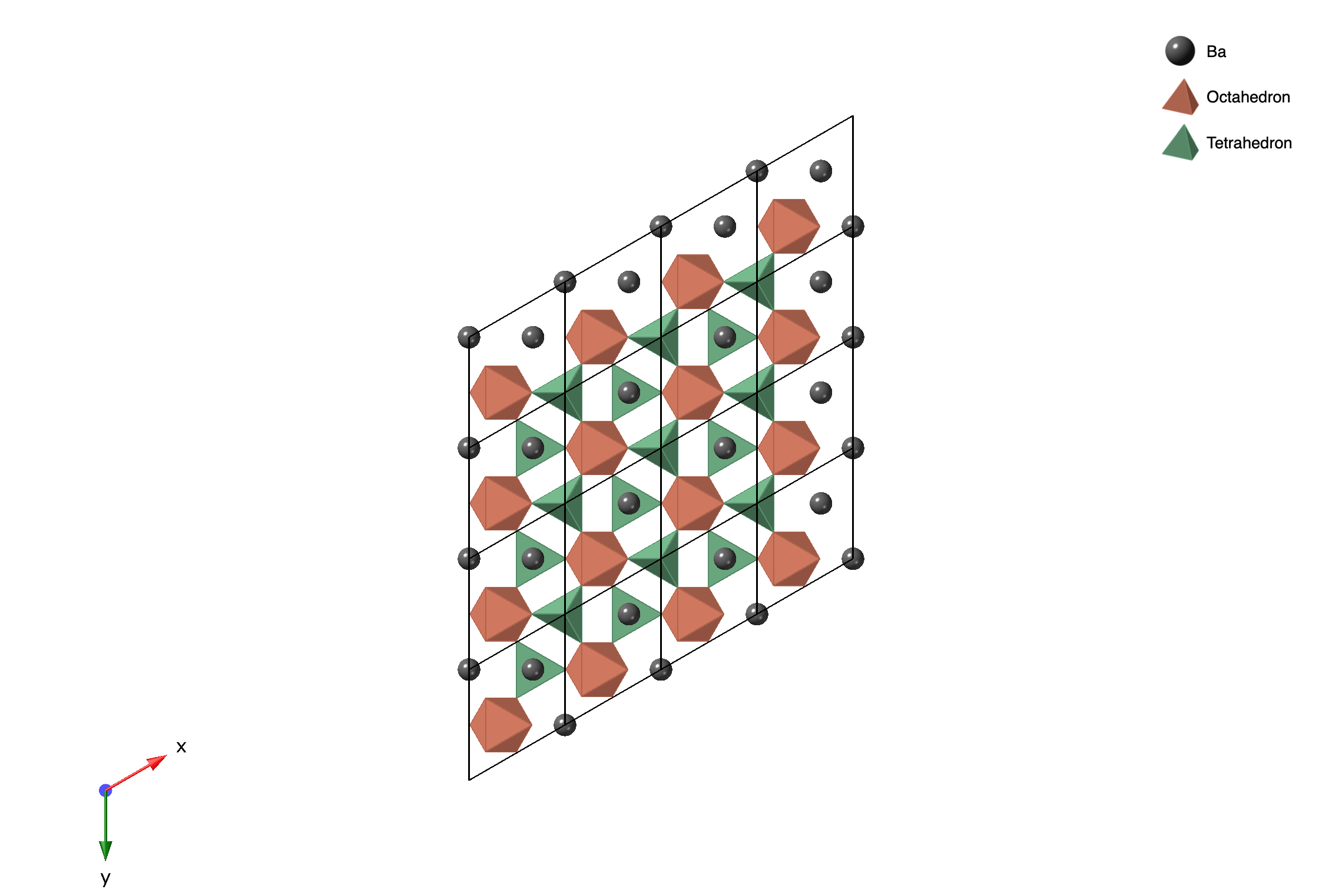
T block structure, view along -c ferrite direction.

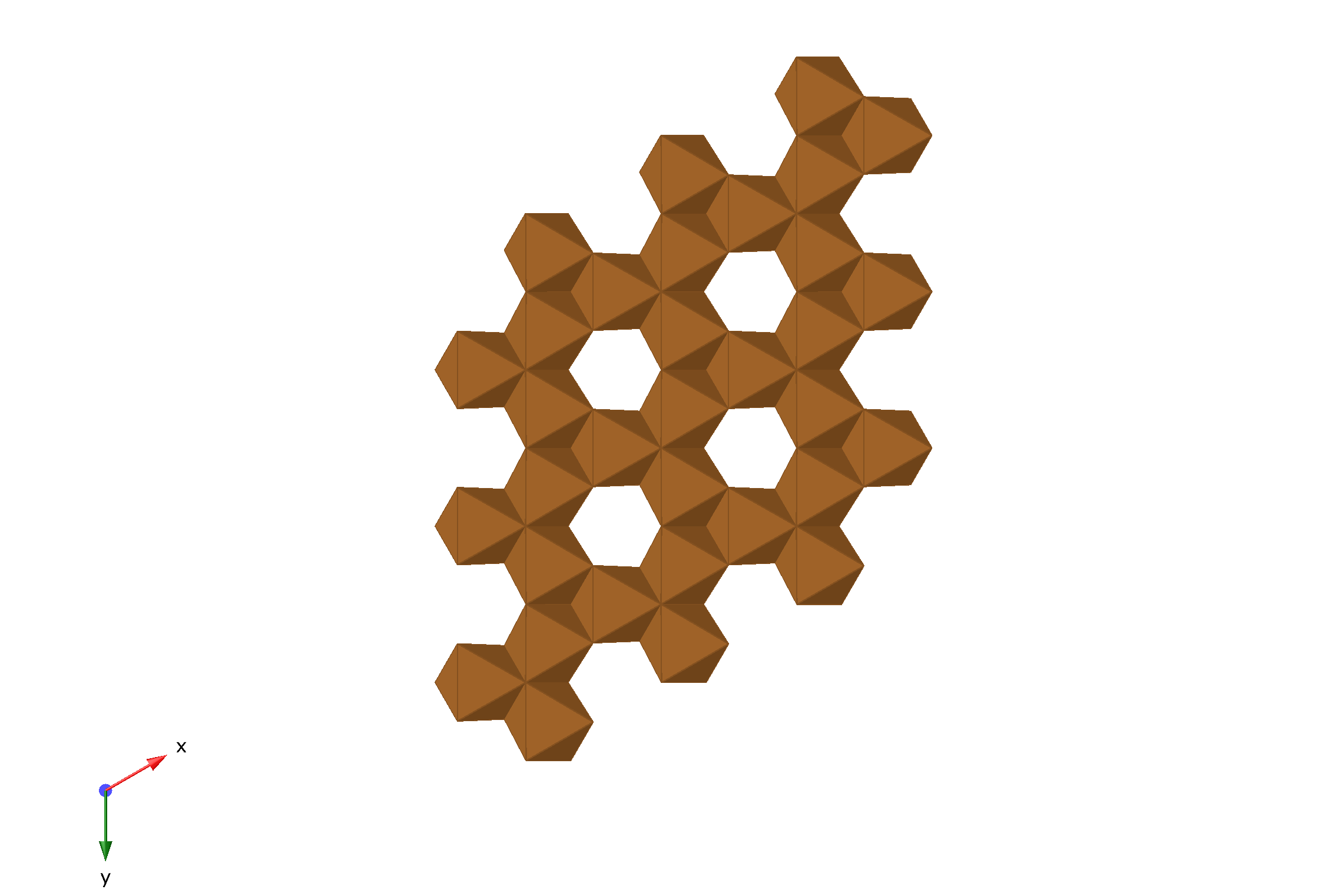
The B layer of S block, view along -c ferrite direction.

=== S block ===
The S block is very common in hexaferrites, which has a chemical formula of Me^{S}_{6}O_{8}^{2+}. Me^{S} are smaller metal cations, for example, Fe and other transition metals or noble metals. The S block is essentially a slab cut along the $(111)$ plane of an AB_{2}O_{4} spinel. Each S block has one A layer and one B layer. The A layer features Me^{S}-centered tetrahedron and Me^{S}-centered octahedron, while the B layer is made up of edge-sharing Me^{S}-centered octahedron. Both A and B layers have the same chemical formula of Me^{S}_{3}O_{4}^{2+}.

=== R block ===
The R block has a chemical formula of Me^{L}Me^{S}_{6}O_{11}^{2-}. Me^{L} are larger metal cations, for example, alkaline earth metals (Ba, Sr,) rare earth metals, Pb, etc. The point group symmetry of the R block is $\bar{6}m2$. The large metal cations are located in the middle layer of the three hexagonally packed layers. This block is also composed of face-sharing Me^{S}-centered octahedra and Me^{S}-centered trigonal bipyramids.

=== T block ===
The T block has a chemical formula of Me^{L}_{2}Me^{S}_{8}O_{14}^{2-}. The point group symmetry of the T block is $3m$. One T block consists of 4 oxygen layers with the two Me^{L} atoms substituting two oxygen atoms in the middle two layers. In one T block, there are both Me^{S}-centered octahedra and Me^{S}-centered tetrahedra.

== Family members ==
=== M-type ferrite ===
M-type ferrite is made up of alternating S and R blocks in the sequence of SRS*R*. (* denotes rotating that layer around the c axis by 180°.) The chemical formula of M-type ferrite is Me^{L}Me^{S}_{12}O_{19}. Common examples are BaFe_{12}O_{19}, SrFe_{12}O_{19}. It exhibits $P6_3/mmc$ space group symmetry. For BaFe_{12}O_{19}, a = 5.89 Å and c = 23.18 Å. M-ferrite is a very robust ferrimagnetic material, thus widely used as fridge magnets, card strips, magnets in speakers, magnetic material in linear tape-open.

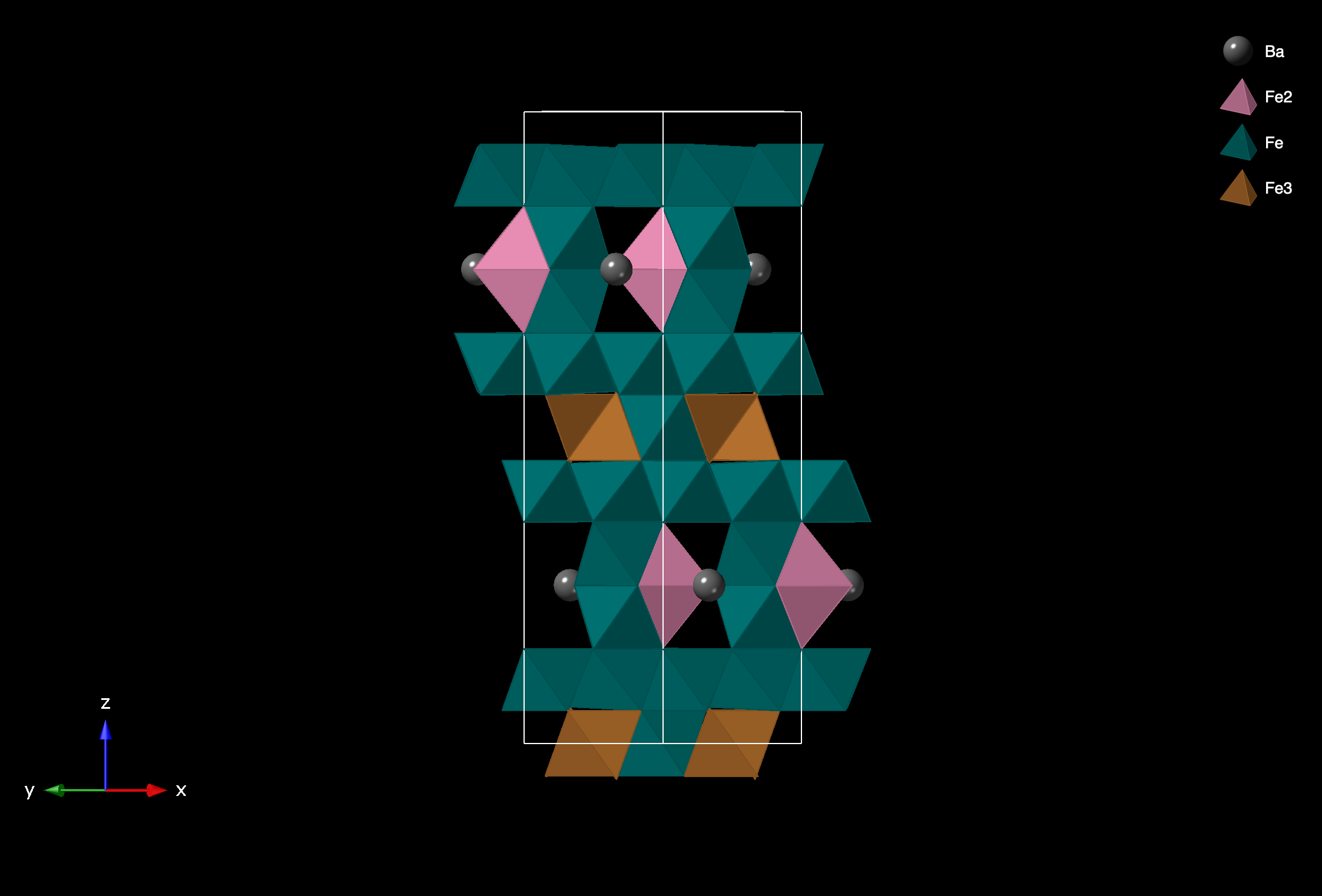
M-type ferrite.

=== W-type ferrite ===
W-type ferrite, like the M-type, consists of S and R blocks, but the stacking order and the number of blocks are different. The stacking sequence in a W-ferrite is SSRS*S*R* and its chemical formula is Me^{L}Me^{S}_{18}O_{27}. It exhibits $P6_3/mmc$ space group symmetry. One example of W-type ferrite is BaFe_{18}O_{27}, with a = 5.88 Å and c = 32.85 Å.

=== R-type ferrite ===
R-type ferrite has a chemical formula of Me^{L}Me^{S}_{6}O_{11} with a space group of $P6_3/mmc$. Unlike other hexaferrites, R-type ferrite doesn't have an S block. Instead, it only has single B layers extracted from the S block. The stacking sequence is BRB*R*.

=== Y-type ferrite ===
Y-type ferrite has a chemical formula of Me^{L}_{2}Me^{S}_{14}O_{22} with a space group of $R\bar{3}m$. One example is Ba_{2}Co_{2}Fe_{12}O_{22} with a = 5.86 Å and c = 43.5 Å. Y-type ferrite is built up with S and T blocks with an order of 3(ST) in one unit cell. There is no horizontal mirror plane in a Y-type ferrite.

=== Z-type ferrite ===
Z-type ferrite has a chemical formula of Me^{L}_{3}Me^{S}_{26}O_{41} with a space group of $P6_3/mmc$. It has a complicated stacking of SRSTS*R*S*T* in one unit cell. Some Z-type members may have sophisticated magnetic properties along different directions. One example is Ba_{3}Co_{2}Fe_{24}O_{41} with a = 5.88 Å and c = 52.3 Å.

=== X-type ferrite ===
X-type ferrite has a chemical formula of Me^{L}_{2}Me^{S}_{30}O_{46} with a space group of $R\bar{3}m$. The stacking order is 3(SRS*S*R*) in one unit cell. One example is Sr_{2}Co_{2}Fe_{28}O_{46} with c = 83.74 Å.
