= NRD =

NRD could refer to:

- Nidaros Roller Derby, Norway
- Non-radiative dielectric, or non-radiating dielectric, as used in non-radiative dielectric waveguide
- Noranda (mining company), Toronto Stock Exchange symbol NRD
- Nordic Airways, ICAO airline code NRD
- Norderney Airfield, IATA airport code NRD
- North Road railway station, National Rail station code NRD
- Non-delivery report, Microsoft Exchange Server system message
- Neural Respiratory Drive
