= F band =

F band may refer to:

- F band (NATO), a radio frequency band from 3 to 4 GHz
- F band (waveguide), a millimetre wave band from 90 to 140 GHz
