= Goubau =

Goubau may refer to:

== Surname ==
- House of Goubau, Belgian noble family
- Anton Goubau (1616–1698), Flemish painter

== Other uses ==
- Goubau line, transmission line used to conduct radio waves
