= Waveguide flange =

Connector for joining two waveguides

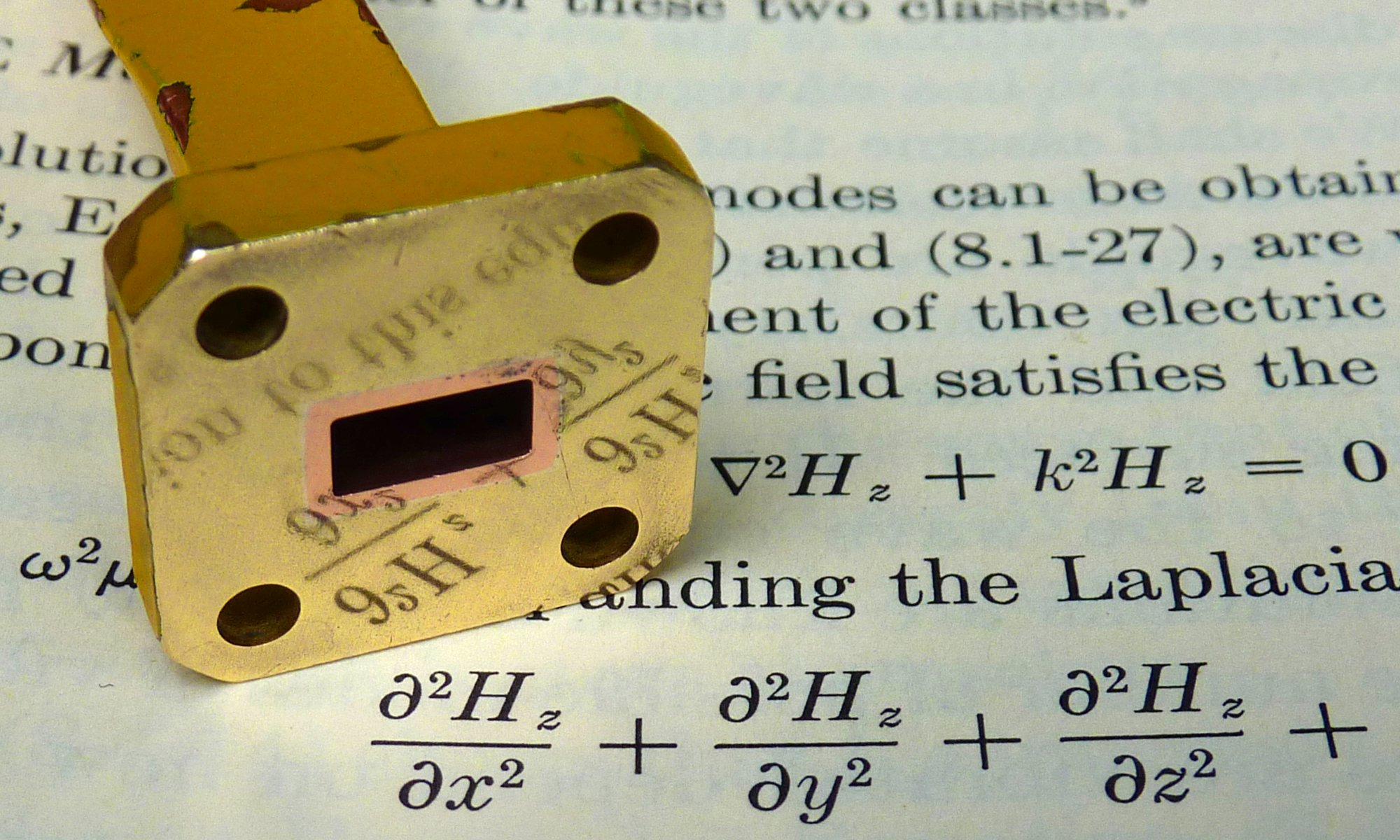
Figure 1. A UBR320 flange on R320 (WG22, WR28) guide. This type of flange has no choke or gasket grooves. The through-mounted assembly is made evident by the distinct colours of the copper waveguide-tube and brass flange.

A waveguide flange is a connector for joining sections of waveguide, and is essentially the same as a pipe flange—a waveguide, in the context of this article, being a hollow metal conduit for microwave energy. The connecting face of the flange is either square, circular or (particularly for large or reduced-height rectangular waveguides), rectangular. The connection between a pair of flanges is usually made with four or more bolts, though alternative mechanisms, such as a threaded collar, may be used where there is a need for rapid assembly and disassembly. Dowel pins are sometimes used in addition to bolts, to ensure accurate alignment, particularly for very small waveguides.

Key features of a waveguide join are; whether or not it is air-tight, allowing the waveguide to be pressurized, and whether it is a contact or a choke connection. This leads to three sorts of flange for each size of rectangular waveguide.

For rectangular waveguides there exist a number of competing standard flanges which are not entirely mutually compatible. Standard flange designs also exist for double-ridge, reduced-height, square and circular waveguides.

== Pressurization ==
The atmosphere within waveguide assemblies is often pressurized, either to prevent the ingress of moisture, or to raise the breakdown voltage in the guide and hence increase the power that it can carry. Pressurization requires that all joints in the waveguide be airtight. This is usually achieved by means of a rubber O-ring seated in a groove in the face of at least one of flanges forming each join. Gasket, gasket/cover or pressurizable flanges (such as that on the right of figure 2), are identifiable by the single circular groove which accommodates the O-ring. It is only necessary for one of the flanges in each pressurizable connection to be of this type; the other may have a plain flat face (like that in figure 1). This ungrooved type is known as a cover, plain or unpressurizable flange.

It is also possible to form air-tight seal between a pair of otherwise unpressurizable flanges using a flat gasket made out of a special electrically conductive elastomer. Two plain cover flanges may be mated without such a gasket, but the connection is then not pressurizable.

== Electrical continuity ==
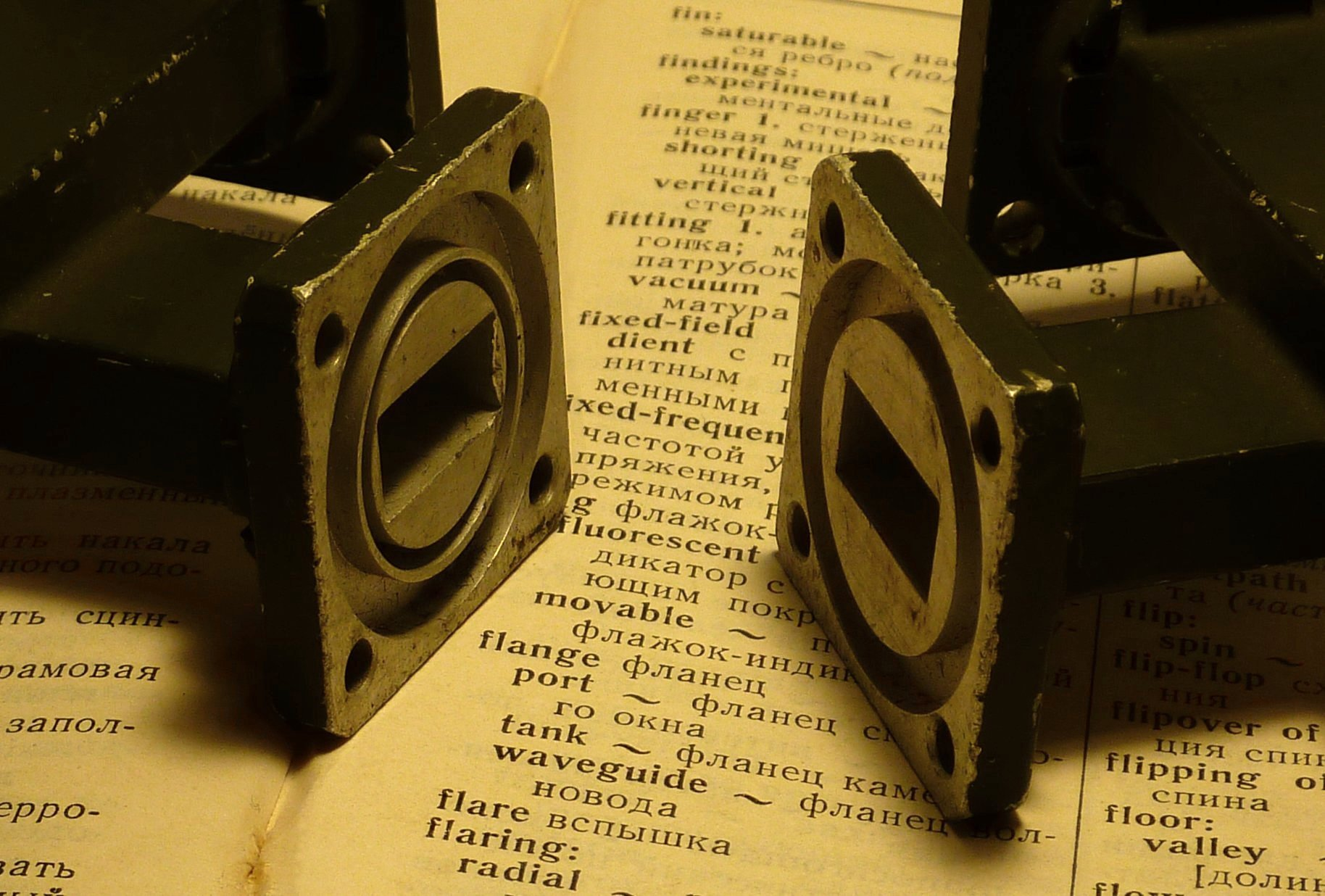
Figure 2. A UG-1666/U (MIL-standard) choke flange (left), and matching gasket/cover flange (right). These flanges are aluminium and are socket-mounted onto aluminium WG18 (WR62) waveguide.

Electric current flows on the inside surface of the waveguides, and must cross the join between them if microwave power is to pass through the connection without reflection or loss.

=== Contact connection ===
A contact connection is formed by the union of any combination of gasket and cover flanges, and ideally creates a continuous inner surface from one waveguide to the other, with no crack at the join to interrupt the surface currents. The difficulty with this sort of connection is that any manufacturing imperfections or dirt or damage on the faces of the flanges will result in a crack. Arcing of the current across the crack will cause further damage, loss of power, and may give rise to arcing from one side of the guide to the other, thereby short circuiting it.

=== Choke connection ===
Figure 3. E-plane cross-section of connected choke and gasket/cover waveguide flanges from figure 2.: 1. waveguide tubing socket-mounted into...; 2. choke flange and...; 3. gasket/cover flange; 4. gap between flange faces (not to scale); 5. point of contact of flange faces; 6. short at bottom of choke ditch; 7. O-ring gaskets to allow pressurization; The gap between the flange faces has been exaggerated by a factor of four to make it clearly visible. The choke flange can also be mated with a plain cover flange and still form a pressure seal.

A choke connection is formed by mating one choke flange and one cover (or gasket/cover) flange. The central region of the choke flange face is very slightly recessed so that it does not touch the face of the cover flange, but is separated from it by a narrow gap. The recessed region is bounded by a deep choke trench (or ditch or groove) cut into the face of the flange. Choke flanges are only used with rectangular waveguide, and are invariably pressurizable, having a gasket groove encircling the choke ditch. The presence of these two concentric circular grooves makes choke flanges easily recognizable. The left-hand flange in figure 2 is a choke flange.

It is considered wrong to join two choke flanges; the resulting gap between the flange faces is twice that intended, and the effect is similar to that of having two joins in the guide rather than one. In the absence of unpressurizable choke flanges, all flanges fall into one of three categories: choke, gasket/cover and cover.

An E-plane cross section of an assembled choke connection is shown in figure 3. This is the plane cutting each of the broad walls of the waveguide along its centre-line, which is where the longitudinal surface currents—those that must cross the join—are at their strongest. The choke ditch and the gap between the flange faces together form a somewhat convoluted side-branch to the path of the main guide. This side branch is designed to present a low input impedance where it meets the broad walls of the waveguide, so that the surface currents there are not obstructed by the gap, but instead flow onto and off of the separated faces of the flanges. Conversely, on the outer edge of the choke ditch, at the point where the two flanges come into physical contact, the ditch presents a high series impedance. The current through the contact point is thus reduced to a small value, and the danger of arcing across any crack between the flanges is likewise reduced.

==== Theory ====
At the operational frequency of the choke flange, the depth of the ditch is approximately one quarter of a wavelength. This is somewhat longer than a quarter of the free-space wavelength, since the electric field also varies in going around the ditch, having two changes of polarity, or one complete wave in the circumference. The ditch thus constitutes a quarter-wave resonant short-circuit stub, and has a high (ideally infinite) input impedance at its mouth. This high impedance is in series with the metal-to-metal connection between the flanges, and minimizes the current across it. The distance from the main waveguide through the gap to the ditch is likewise one quarter of a wavelength in the E-plane. The gap thus forms a quarter-wave transformer, transforming the high impedance at the top of the ditch to a low (ideally zero) impedance at the broad wall of the waveguide.

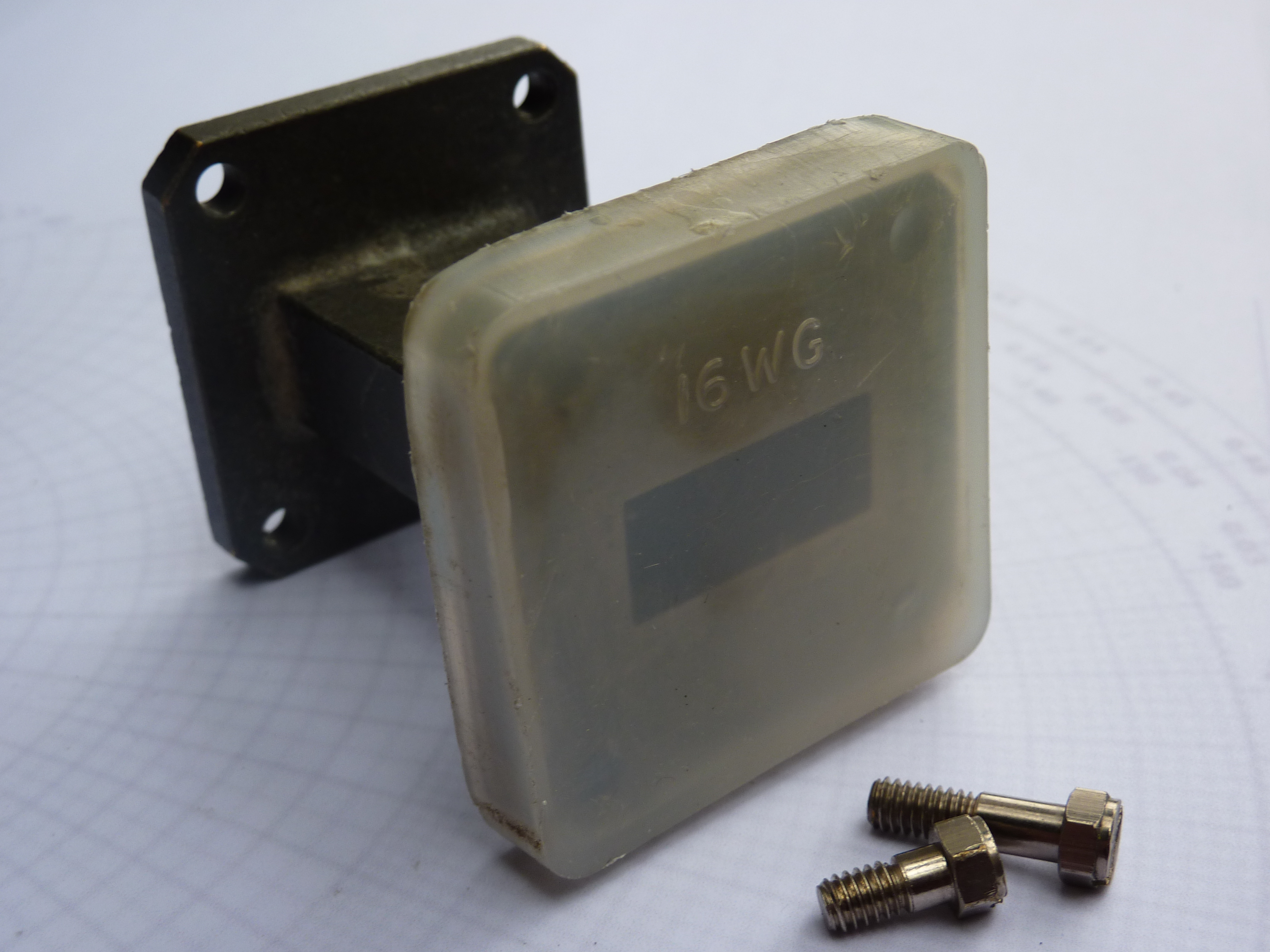
Figure 4. Plastic caps over disconnected flanges prevent dirt and moisture entering the waveguide, in addition to protecting the face of the flange from damage.

==== Frequency dependence ====
Because the working of a choke connection depends on the wavelength, its impedance can be zero at at most one frequency within the operating band of the waveguide. However, by making the gap extremely narrow, and the choke ditch relatively wide, the input impedance can be kept small over a broad frequency band. For gap and ditch widths in a fixed proportion, the connection input impedance is approximately proportional to either width (doubling both widths is like having two connections in series). Increasing just the ditch width, increases its input impedance proportionately, and to a some extent decreases the transformed impedance, though the effect is limited when the gap-length is not exactly one quarter wavelength. The MIL-spec choke flanges have a gap width of between 2% and 3% of the waveguide height (the smaller inner dimension of the guide), which for WR28 waveguide (WG22) amounts to a gap of just 3 thousandths of an inch. The choke ditch in these flanges is some 8 times wider (around 20% of the waveguide height), although the proportions vary considerably, as the width-to-height ratio of the standard mid-size guides deviates from 2:1. MIL-spec choke flanges are intended for use over the full recommended operational frequency band of the waveguide (that is roughly from 1.3 to 1.9 times the guide cutoff frequency).

==== History ====
Claimants to the invention of the choke connection include Norman Ramsey with the assistance of Shep Roberts while the two were working at the MIT Radiation Lab during World War II. Winfield Salisbury also claims to have made the invention while leader of the Radio Frequency Group at the MIT Radiation Lab between 1941 and 1942. The invention was not patented.

=== Performance ===
Choke connections can achieve a VSWR of 1.01 (a return of −46 dB) over a useful bandwidth, and eliminate the danger of arcing at the join. Nevertheless, better performance is possible with a carefully made contact-connection between undamaged plain flanges.

== Attachment to waveguide ==
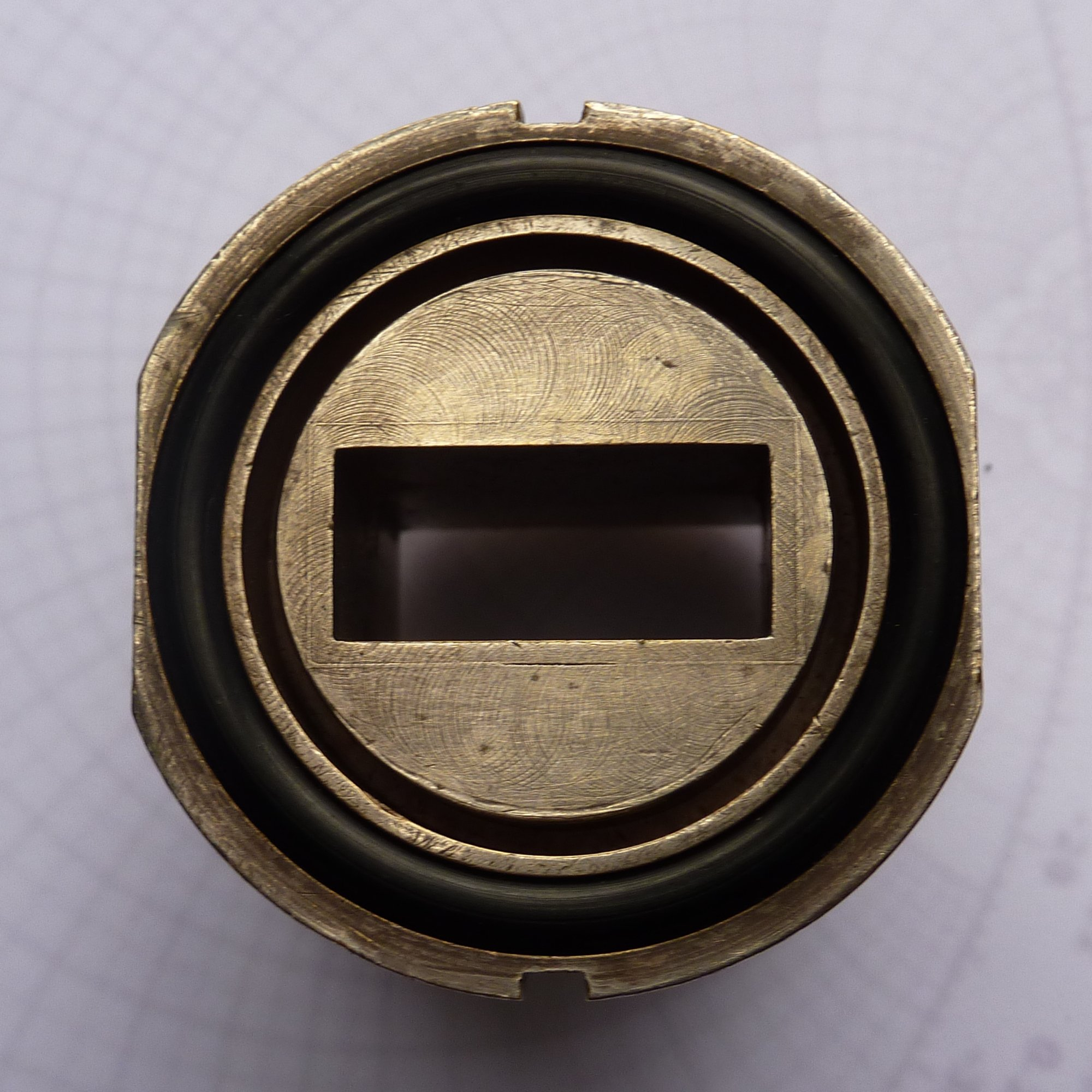
Figure 5. RCSC 5985-99-083-0003 choke flange through-mounted on WG16 (WR90) waveguide. Machining down the end of the waveguide tube has left a clear pattern across the recessed face and the end of the tube. The flats on either side of the flange are to allow a threaded collar to be manoeuvred over it, while the notches at the top and bottom are for alignment. The O-ring for pressurization is in place.

Flanges are either through-mounted or socket-mounted on the end of the waveguide tube.

=== Through-mounting ===
In through-mounting, the waveguide tube passes all the way through to the front face of the flange. Initially the tube is allowed to protrude slightly beyond the face of the flange, then after the two pieces have been soldered or brazed together, the end of the tube is machined down so that it is perfectly level with the face. This type of construction can be seen in figures 1, 4 and 5.

=== Socket-mounting ===
In socket-mounting, the aperture in the front face of the flange matches the inside dimensions of the waveguide. At the back, the aperture is rabbeted to form a socket which fits onto the end of the waveguide tubing. The two pieces are soldered or brazed together to ensure an uninterrupted conducting path between the inside surface of the waveguide tube and the mouth of the flange. This type of construction can be seen in figure 2, and is shown diagrammatically in figure 3. A variation on this is butt-mounting, in which the waveguide tube abuts the back face of the flange. The back of the flange has a number of protrusions, sufficient to align the tube, but without forming an unbroken socket-wall around it.

Socket mounting avoids the need to machine the face of the flange during attachment. For choke flanges this means that the depth to which the face is recessed, and the width of the resulting gap is fixed when the flange is manufactured and will not change when it is attached. MIL-spec choke flanges are socket-mounted.

== Standards ==
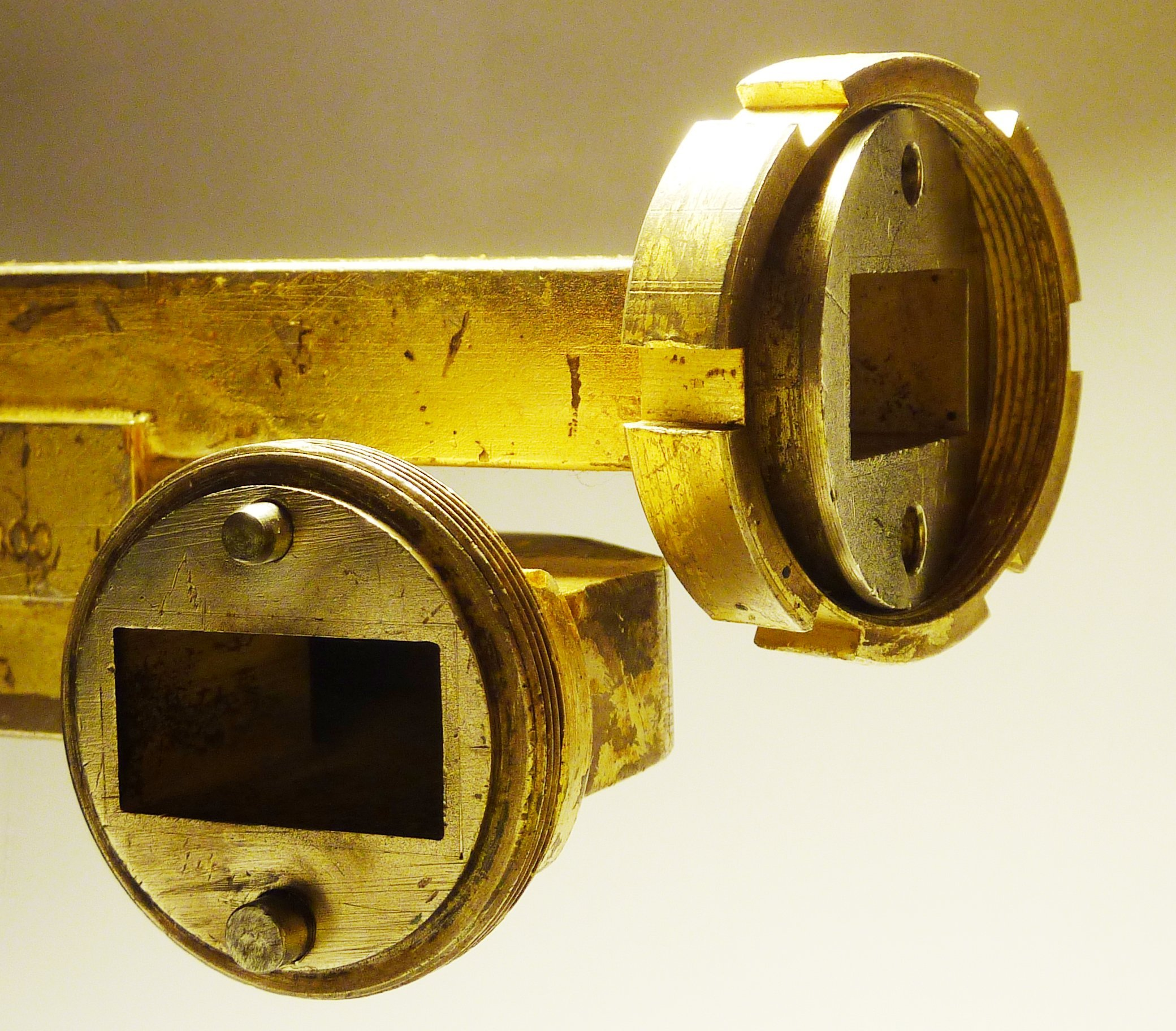
Figure 6. Non-standard quick-disconnect (threaded collar) flanges on WR102 guide

=== MIL-spec ===
MIL-DTL-3922 is a United States Military Standard giving detailed descriptions of choke, gasket/cover and cover flanges for rectangular waveguide. MIL-DTL-39000/3 describes flanges for double-ridge waveguide, and formerly also for single-ridge guide.

MIL-spec flanges have designations of the form UG-xxxx/U where the x's represent a variable-length catalogue number, not in itself containing any information about the flange.

These standards are works of the U.S. government, and are freely available online from the U.S. Defense Logistics Agency.

=== IEC ===
International Electrotechnical Commission (IEC) standard IEC 60154 describes flanges for square and circular waveguides, as well as for what it refers to as flat, medium-flat, and ordinary rectangular guides.

IEC flanges are identified by an alphanumeric code consisting of; the letter U, P or C for unpressurizable (plain cover), pressurizable (with a gasket groove) and choke (with both choke gasket grooves); a second letter, indicating the shape and other details of the flange and finally the IEC identifier for the waveguide. For standard rectangular waveguide the second letter is A to E, where A and C are round flanges, B is square and D and E are rectangular. So for example UBR220 is a square plain cover flange for R220 waveguide (that is, for WG20, WR42), PDR84 is a rectangular gasket flange for R84 waveguide (WG15, WR112) and CAR70 is a round choke flange for R70 waveguide (WG14, WR137).

The IEC standard is endorsed by a number of European standards organizations, such as the British Standards Institution.

=== EIA ===
The Electronic Industries Alliance (EIA) is the body that defined the WR designations for standard rectangular waveguides. EIA flanges are designated CMR (for connector, miniature, rectangular waveguide) or CPR (connector, pressurizable, rectangular waveguide) followed by the EIA number (WR number) for the relevant waveguide. So for example, CPR112 is a gasket flange for waveguide WR112 (WG15).

=== RCSC ===
The Radio Components Standardization Committee (RCSC) is the body that originated the WG designations for standard rectangular waveguides. It also defined standard choke and cover flanges with identifiers of the form 5985-99-xxx-xxxx where the x's represent a catalogue number, not in itself containing any information about the flange.
