= Radio frequency power transmission =

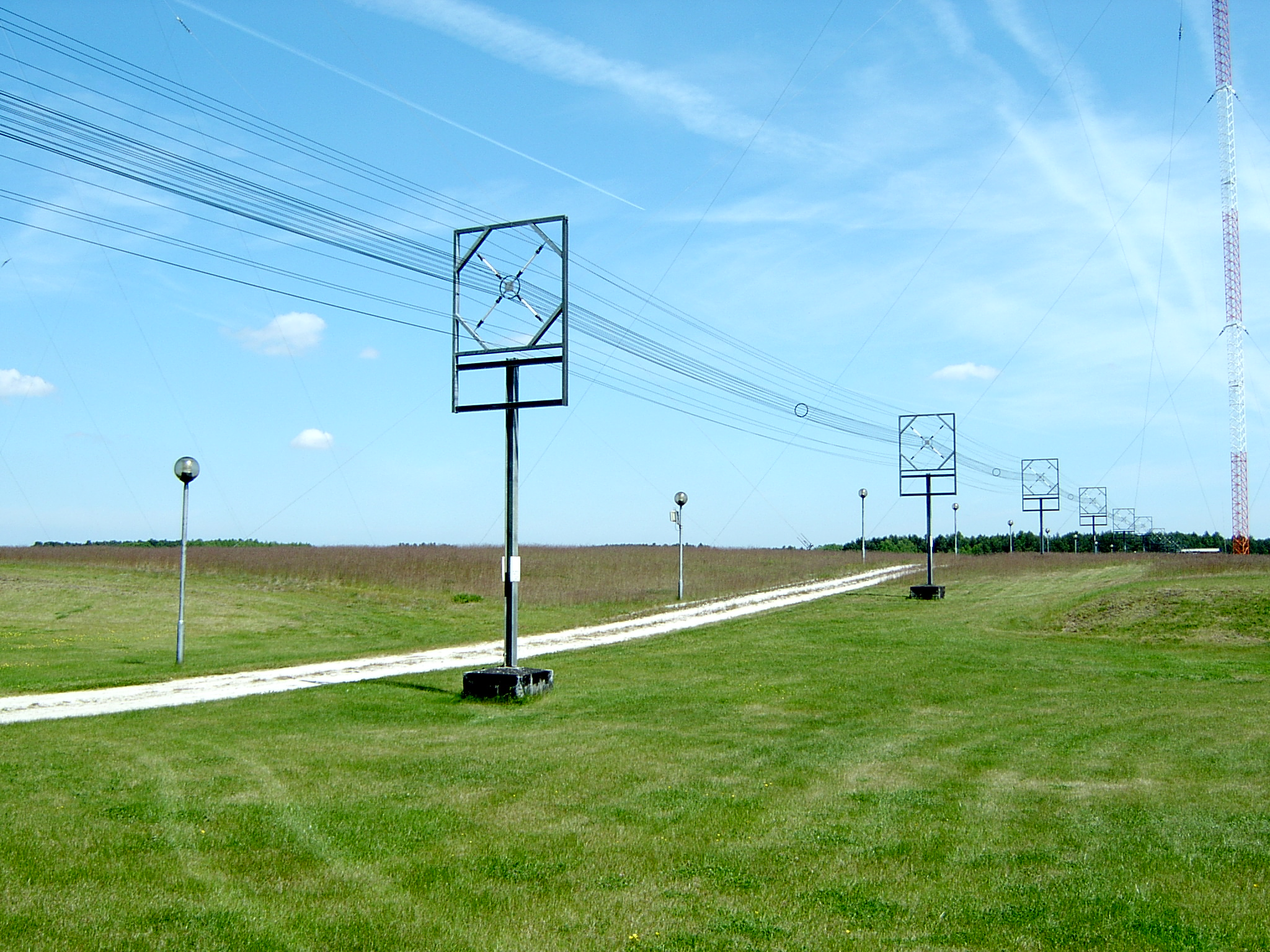
Overhead radio frequency power transmission line at Solec Kujawski longwave transmitter, Solec Kujawski, Poland

Radio frequency power transmission is the transmission of the output power of a transmitter to an antenna. When the antenna is not situated close to the transmitter, special transmission lines are required.

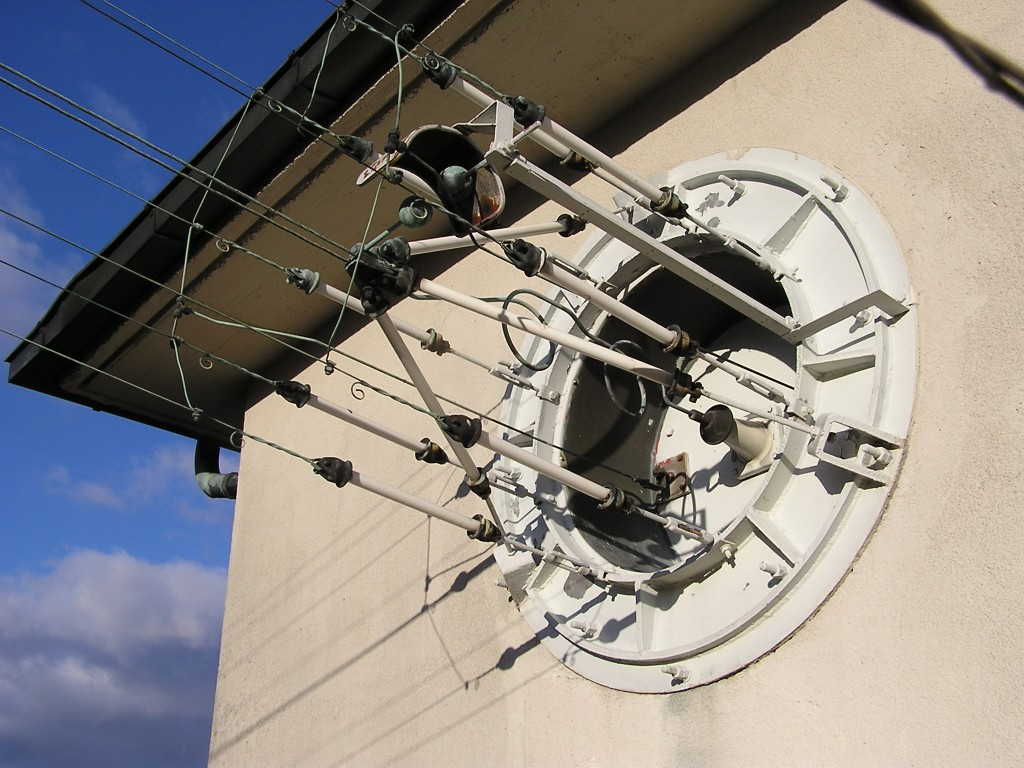
Bushing

The most common type of transmission line for this purpose is large-diameter coaxial cable. At high-power transmitters, cage lines are used. Cage lines are a kind of overhead line similar in construction to coaxial cables. The interior conductor is held by insulators mounted on a circular device in the middle. On the circular device, there are wires for the other pole of the line.

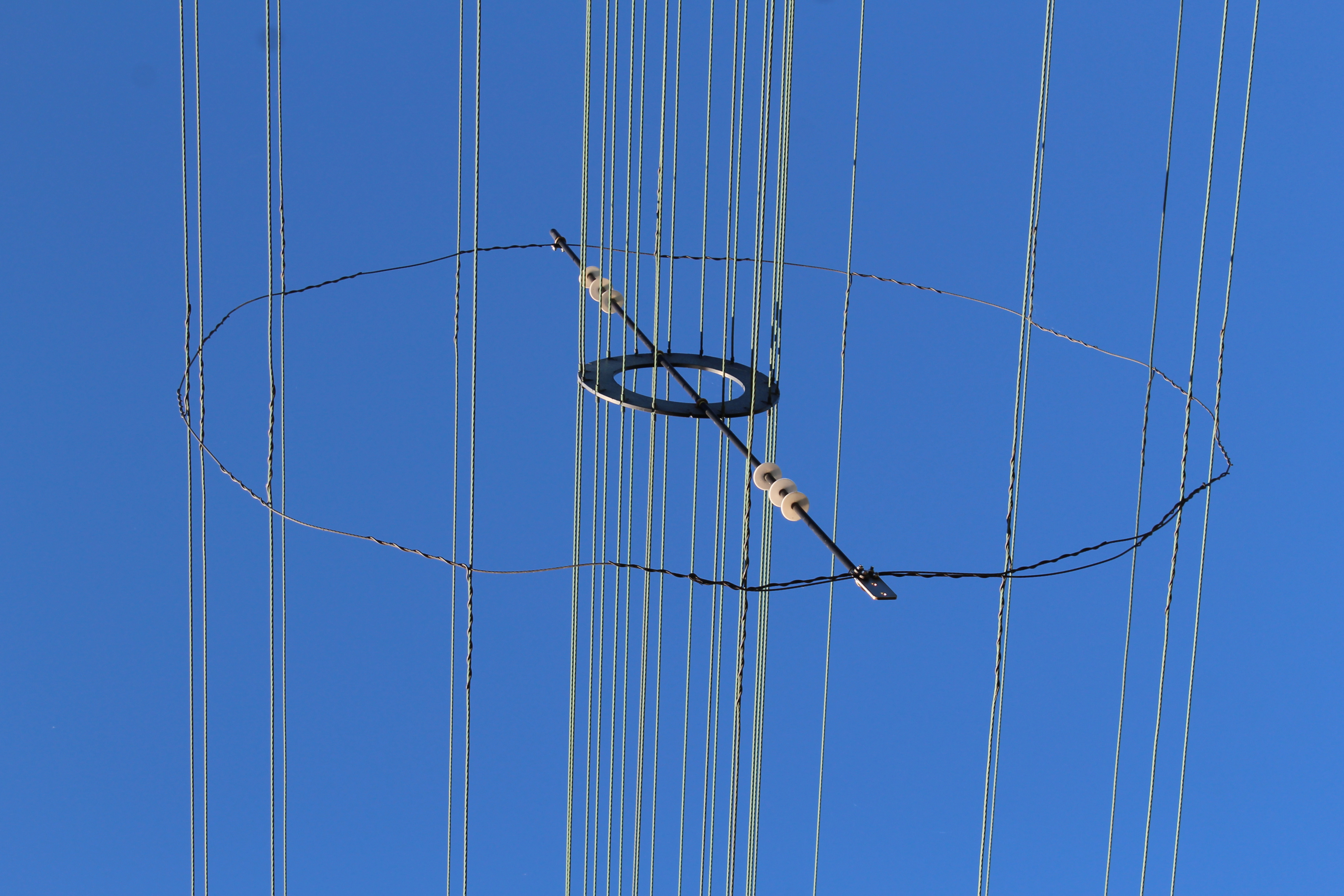
Conductor bundle with spacer insulator

Cage lines are used at high-power transmitters in Europe, like longwave transmitter Topolna, longwave-transmitter Solec Kujawski and some other high-power transmitters for long-, medium- and shortwave.

For UHF and VHF, Goubau lines are sometimes used. They consist of an insulated single wire mounted on insulators. On a Goubau line, the wave travels as longitudinal currents surrounded by transverse EM fields. For microwaves, waveguides are used.
