= F band (waveguide) =

Waveguide F band
- Frequency range: 90 – 140 GHz
- Wavelength range: 3.33 – 2.14 mm
- Related bands: W / mm (IEEE); EHF (ITU)

The waveguide F band is the range of radio frequencies from 90 GHz to 140 GHz in the electromagnetic spectrum, corresponding to the recommended frequency band of operation of WR8 waveguides. These frequencies are equivalent to wave lengths between 3.33 mm and 2.14 mm. The E band is in the EHF range of the radio spectrum.
