= Single-wire transmission line =

Method of electrical transmission

A single-wire transmission line (or single wire method) is a method of transmitting electrical power or signals using only a single electrical conductor. This is in contrast to the usual use of a pair of wires providing a complete circuit, or an electrical cable likewise containing (at least) two conductors for that purpose.

The single-wire transmission line is not the same as the single-wire earth return system, which is not covered in this article. The latter system relies on a return current through the ground, using the earth as a second conductor between ground terminal electrodes. In a single-wire transmission line there is no second conductor of any form.

== History ==
As early as the 1780s Luigi Galvani first observed the effect of static electricity in causing the legs of a frog to twitch, and observed the same effect produced just due to certain metallic contacts with the frog involving a complete circuit. The latter effect was correctly understood by Alessandro Volta as an electric current inadvertently produced by what would become known as a voltaic cell (battery). He understood that such a current required a complete circuit to conduct the electricity, even though the actual nature of electric currents was not at all understood (only a century later would the electron be discovered). All subsequent development of electrical motors, lights, etc. relied on the principle of a complete circuit, generally involving a pair of wires, but sometimes using the ground as the second conductor (as with commercial telegraphy).

At the end of the 19th century, Nikola Tesla demonstrated that by using an electrical network tuned to resonance it was possible to transmit electric power using only a single conductor, with no need for a return wire. This was spoken of as the "transmission of electrical energy through one wire without return".

In 1891, 1892, and 1893 demonstration lectures with electrical oscillators before the AIEE at Columbia College, N.Y.C., the IEE, London, the Franklin Institute, Philadelphia, and National Electric Light Association, St. Louis, it was shown that electric motors and single-terminal incandescent lamps can be operated through a single conductor without a return wire. Although apparently lacking a complete circuit, such a topology effectively obtains a return circuit by virtue of the load's self-capacitance and parasitic capacitance.

Thus coils of the proper dimensions might be connected each with only one of its ends to the mains from a machine of low E. M. F., and though the circuit of the machine would not be closed in the ordinary acceptance of the term, yet the machine might be burned out if a proper resonance effect would be obtained.

The final reference to "burning out" a machine was to emphasize the ability of such a system to transmit a large power given a proper impedance match, as can be obtained through electrical resonance.

== Theory ==
This observation has been rediscovered several times, and described, for instance, in a 1993 patent. Single-wire transmission in this sense is not possible using direct current and totally impractical for low frequency alternating currents such as the standard 50–60 Hz power line frequencies. At much higher frequencies, however, it is possible for the return circuit (which would normally be connected through a second wire) to utilize the self- and parasitic capacitance of a large conductive object, perhaps the housing of the load itself. Although the self-capacitance of even large objects is rather small in ordinary terms, as Tesla himself appreciated it is possible to resonate that capacitance using a sufficiently large inductor (depending on the frequency used), in which case the large reactance of that capacitance is cancelled out. This allows a large current to flow (and a large power to be supplied to the load) without requiring an extremely high voltage source. Although this method of power transmission has long been understood, it is not clear whether there has been any commercial application of this principle for power transmission.

== Single conductor waveguides ==
As early as 1899, Arnold Sommerfeld published a paper predicting the use of a single cylindrical conductor (wire) to propagate radio frequency energy as a surface wave. Sommerfeld's "wire wave" was of theoretical interest as a propagating mode, but this was decades before technology existed for the generation of sufficiently high radio frequencies for any such experimentation, let alone practical applications. What's more, the solution described an infinite transmission line without consideration of coupling energy into (or out of) it.

Of particular practical interest, though, was the prediction of a substantially lower signal attenuation compared to using the same wire as the center conductor of a coaxial cable. Contrary to the previous explanation of the full transmitted power being due to a classical current through a wire, in this case the currents in the conductor itself are much smaller, with the energy transmitted in the form of an electromagnetic wave (radio wave). But in this case, the presence of the wire acts to guide that wave toward the load, rather than radiating away.

The reduction of ohmic losses compared to using coax (or other two-wire transmission lines) is especially an advantage at higher frequencies where these losses become very large. Practically speaking, use of this transmission mode below microwave frequencies is very problematic due to the very extended field patterns around the wire. The fields associated with the surface wave along the conductor are significant out to many conductor diameters, therefore metallic or even dielectric materials inadvertently present in these regions will distort the propagation of the mode and typically will increase propagation loss. Although there is no wavelength dependence to this dimension in the transverse direction, in the direction of propagation it is necessary to have a minimum of one half wave of conductor length to fully support the propagating mode. For these reasons, and at frequencies available prior to about 1950, the practical disadvantages of such transmission completely outweighed the reduced loss due to the wire's finite conductivity.

=== Goubau line ===
In 1950 Georg Goubau revisited Sommerfeld's discovery of a surface wave mode along a wire, but with the intent of increasing its practicality. One major goal was to reduce the extent of the fields surrounding the conductor so that such a wire would not require an unreasonably large clearance. Another problem was that Sommerfeld's wave propagated exactly at the speed of light (or the slightly lower speed of light in air, for a wire surrounded by air). That meant that there would be radiation losses. The straight wire acts as a long wire antenna, robbing the radiated power from the guided mode. If the propagation velocity can be reduced below the speed of light then the surrounding fields become evanescent, and are thus unable to propagate energy away from the area surrounding the wire.

Goubau investigated the beneficial effect of a wire whose surface is structured (rather than an exact cylinder) such as would be obtained using a threaded wire. More significantly, Goubau proposed the application of a dielectric layer surrounding the wire. Even a rather thin layer (relative to the wavelength) of a dielectric will reduce the propagation velocity sufficiently below the speed of light, eliminating radiation loss from a surface wave along the surface of a long straight wire. This modification also had the effect of greatly reducing the footprint of the electromagnetic fields surrounding the wire, addressing the other practical concern.

Finally, Goubau invented a method for launching (and receiving) electrical energy from such a transmission line. The patented Goubau line (or "G-line") consists of a single conductor coated with dielectric material. At each end is a wide disk with a hole in the center through which the transmission line passes. The disk may be the base of a cone, with its narrow end connected typically to the shield of coaxial feed line, and the transmission line itself connecting to the center conductor of the coax.

Even with the reduced extent of the surrounding fields in Goubau's design, such a device only becomes practical at UHF frequencies and above. With technological development at terahertz frequencies, where metallic losses are yet greater, the use of transmission using surface waves and Goubau lines appears promising.

=== E-Line ===
From 2003 through 2008 patents were filed for a system using Sommerfeld's original bare (uncoated) wire, but employing a launcher similar to that developed by Goubau. It was promoted under the name "E-Line" through 2009. This line is claimed to be completely non-radiating, propagating energy by a previously ignored transverse-magnetic (TM) wave. The intended application is high information rate channels using existing power lines for communications purposes.

== See also ==
- Power line communication
- Single-ended signaling
- Single-wire earth return
- Surface wave
