= Goubau line =

Single wire transmission line

A Goubau line or Sommerfeld–Goubau line, or G-line for short, is a single-wire transmission line used to conduct radio waves at UHF and microwave frequencies. The dielectric coated transmission line was invented by F. Harms in 1907 and Georg Goubau in 1950, based on work on surface waves on wires from 1899 by Arnold Sommerfeld. It is used as a feedline at UHF to link high frequency transmitters and receivers to their antennas, and in scientific research.

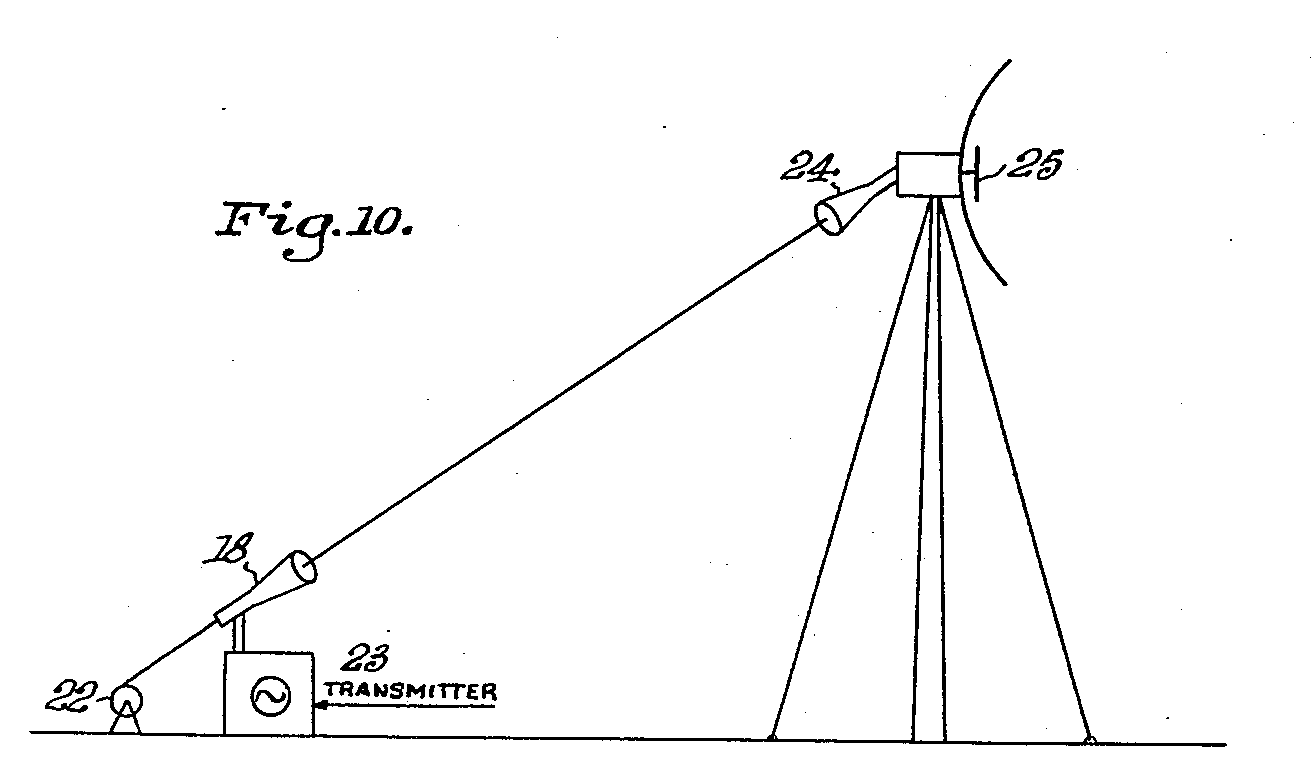
Illustration from Goubau's patent showing the conductor and launchers

== Description ==
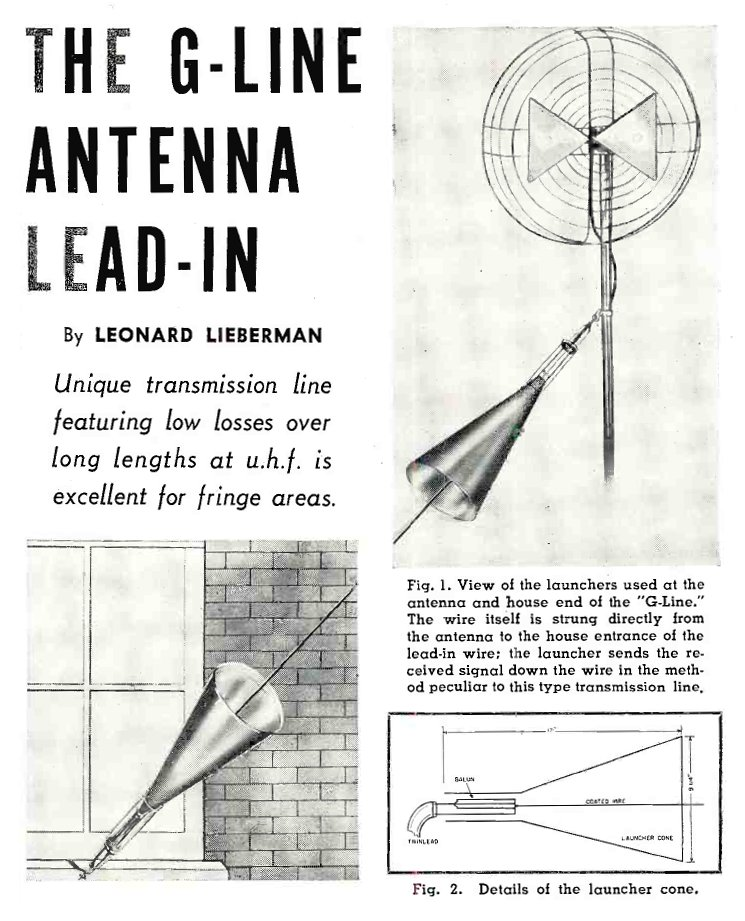
1955 article on Goubau feedline for UHF television antennas showing line and cone launchers

The Goubau line itself consists of a single wire conductor coated with dielectric material. Coupling to and from the G-line is done with conical metal "launchers" or "catchers", with their narrow ends connected for example to the shield of coaxial feed line, and with the transmission line passing through a hole in the conical tips. An advantage of the Goubau line is that it can have lower attenuation due to dielectric losses at high frequencies than other types of transmission line. Parallel line (twin lead) and coaxial cable, which are used to carry lower frequency radio signals, have high losses at the upper end of the UHF band, and are almost useless for distances over 100 feet (33 meters). Goubau lines can serve as low loss antenna feedlines at these frequencies, up to microwave frequencies where a waveguide must be used."

A G-line is a type of waveguide, rather than a wire in an electric circuit. The G-line functions by slowing the propagation velocity of EM waves below the free-space velocity, causing the wavefronts to slightly bend inwards towards the conductor, which keeps the waves entrained. Bends of large radius are tolerated, but too sharp a bend in the single wire will cause the line to radiate and lose energy into space. In theory the dielectric coating is a requirement, it slows the wave and focuses it along the wire. But some users note that in practice the finite conductivity of metals may produce a similar effect, and a bare G-line can entrain a propagating wave.

Other structures besides horns have been used to couple radio waves into and out of Goubau lines; waves can be "launched" from planar structures like tapered coplanar waveguides at much higher frequencies, into the terahertz band. The dimension of the single metallic conductor is then typically 1 μm.

The Goubau line conducts energy via one-dimensional electromagnetic surface waves, analogous to the two-dimensional surface waves called ground waves that carry the signal from MF AM broadcasting stations to home AM radios. The ability of surface waves to bend and follow the contour of a conductor explains why AM radio stations can be received on the far side of hills, and how over-the-horizon radar works.

== See also ==
- Surface wave
- Surface plasmon polariton
- Radio frequency power transmission

== Patents ==
- U.S. patent 2,685,068, "Surface wave transmission line". Georg J. E. Goubau
- U.S. patent 2,921,277, "Launching and receiving of surface waves". Georg J. E. Goubau.
