= Non-radiative dielectric waveguide =

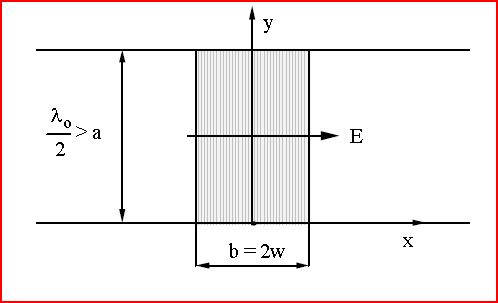
Figure 1

The non-radiative dielectric (NRD) waveguide was introduced by Yoneyama in 1981. In Fig. 1 the crosses shown: it consists of a dielectric rectangular slab of height (a) and width (b), which is placed between two metallic parallel plates of a suitable width. The structure is practically the same as the H waveguide, proposed by Tischer in 1953. Due to the dielectric slab, the electromagnetic field is confined in the vicinity of the dielectric region, whereas in the outside region for suitable frequencies, the electromagnetic field decays exponentially. Therefore, if the metallic plates are sufficiently extended, the field is practically negligible at the end of the plates and therefore the situation does not greatly differ from the ideal case in which the plates are infinitely extended. The polarization of the electric field in the required mode is mainly parallel to the conductive walls. As it is known, if the electric field is parallel to the walls, the conduction losses decrease in the metallic walls at the increasing frequency, whereas, if the field is perpendicular to the walls, losses increase at the increasing frequency. Since the NRD waveguide has been devised for its implementation at millimeter waves, the selected polarization minimizes the ohmic losses in the metallic walls.

The essential difference between the H waveguide and the NRD guide is that in the latter the spacing between the metallic plates is less than half the wavelength in a vacuum, whereas in the H waveguide the spacing is greater. The conduction losses in the metallic plates decrease at the increasing spacing. Therefore, this spacing is larger in the H waveguide, used as a transmission medium for long distances; instead, the NRD waveguide is used for millimeter wave integrated circuit applications in which very short distances are typical. Thus an increase in losses is not of great importance.

The choice of a little spacing between the metallic plates has a fundamental consequence that the required mode results below the cut-off in the outside air regions. In this way, any discontinuity, such as a bend or a junction, is purely reactive. This permits radiation and interference to be minimized (hence the name of the non-radiative guide); this fact is of vital importance in integrated circuit applications. Instead, in the case of the H waveguide, the above-mentioned discontinuities cause radiation and interference phenomena, as the desired mode, being above cutoff, can propagate towards the outside. In any case, it is important to notice that, if these discontinuities modify the symmetry of the structure with reference to the median horizontal plane, there is anyway radiation in the form of TEM mode in the parallel metallic plate guide and this mode results above cutoff, the distance between the plates may be no matter short. This aspect must always be considered in the design of the various components and junctions, and at the same time much attention has to be paid to the adherence of the dielectric slab to the metallic walls because the above-mentioned phenomena of losses are generated. This occurs when in general any asymmetry in the cross section confined mode into a "leaky" mode.

== The dispersion relation in the NRD waveguide ==
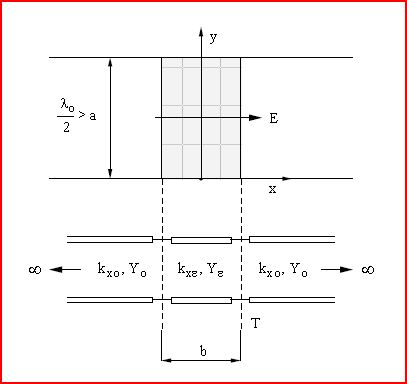
Figure 2

The dispersion relation, the equation yielding the longitudinal propagation constant $k_{z}=\beta -j\alpha$, is a function of the frequency and the geometric parameters for the various modes of the structure. In this case, however, this relation cannot be expressed explicitly, as it is verified in the most elementary case of the rectangular waveguide, but it is implicitly given by a transcendental equation.

== The transverse resonance method ==
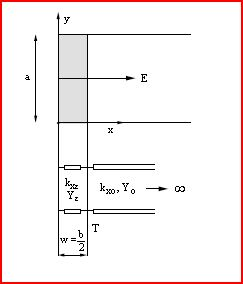
Figure 3

In order to obtain the dispersion relation it is possible to proceed in two different ways. The first one, which is simpler from the analytic point of view, consists of applying the transverse resonance method to obtain a transverse equivalent network. According to this method, the resonance condition along a transverse direction will be applied. This condition brings to a transcendental equation that, numerically solved, gives possible values for the transverse wavenumbers. Exploiting the well-known relation of separability which links the wavenumbers in the various directions and the frequency, it is possible to obtain the values of the longitudinal propagation constant k_{z} for the various modes.

It is supposed that the radiation losses, because actually the metallic plates have a finite width, are negligible. In fact, supposing that the field evanescent in the outside air-regions is negligible at the aperture, one can assume that the situation substantially coincides with the ideal case of the metallic plates having infinite width. Thus, one can assume the transverse equivalent network shown in Fig. 2. In it k_{xε} and k_{x0} are the wavenumbers in the x transverse direction, in the dielectric and in the air, respectively; Y_{ε} and Y_{0} are the associated characteristic admittances of the equivalent transmission line. The presence of the metallic plates, considered perfectly conductive, imposes the possible values for the wavenumber in the y vertical direction: $k_{y}=\frac{m\pi }{a}$, with m = 0, 1, 2, ... These values are the same in the air as in the dielectric regions. As above mentioned, the wavenumbers must satisfy the separability relations. In the air region, assimilated to a vacuum, one obtains

$k_{o}^{2}=\left ( \frac{2\pi }{\lambda_{o}} \right )^{2}=k_{xo}^{2}+k_{y}^{2}+k_{z}^{2}=- \left | k_{xo} \right | ^{2} +k_{y}^{2}+\beta ^{2} \ \ \ \ (1)$

being k_{o} and λ_{o} the wavenumber and the wavelength in a vacuum, respectively. It is assumed that k_{z} = β, because the structure is non-radiating and lossless, and moreover k_{xo}= – j | k_{xo} | , because the field has to be evanescent in the air regions. In the dielectric region, instead, it is

$k^{2}=k_{o}^{2}\varepsilon _{r}=\left ( \frac{2\pi }{\lambda} \right )^{2}=k_{x\varepsilon }^{2}+k_{y}^{2}+k_{z}^{2}= k_{x\varepsilon }^{2}+k_{y}^{2}+\beta ^{2} \ \ \ \ \ \ (2)$

where k and λ are the wavenumber and the wavelength, respectively in the dielectric region and $\varepsilon _{r}$ is the relative dielectric constant.

Unlikely k_{xo}, k_{xε} is real, corresponding to a configuration of standing waves inside the dielectric region. The wavenumbers k_{y} and k_{z} are equal in all the regions. This fact is due to the continuity conditions of the tangential components of the electric and magnetic fields, at the interface. As a consequence, one obtains the continuity of voltage and current in the equivalent transmission line. Thus the transverse resonance method automatically takes into account the boundary conditions at the metallic walls and continuity conditions at the air-dielectric interface.

Analyzing the possible transverse modes, in the air regions (being $a< \frac{\lambda _{o}}{2}$) only the mode with m=0 can propagate along x; this mode is a TEM mode traveling obliquely in the xz-plane, with the non-zero field components E_{y}, H_{x}, H_{z}. This mode always results above cutoff, no matter small a is, but it is not excited if the symmetry of the structure with reference to the middle plane y = a/2 is preserved. In fact, in symmetrical structures, modes with different polarizations from that of the exciting field are not excited. In the dielectric region, instead, one has $\lambda =\frac{\lambda _{o}}{\sqrt{\varepsilon _{r}}}$ . The mode with index m is above cutoff if a/λ > m/2. For example, if ε_{r} = 2.56, (polystyrene), f = 50 GHz and a = 2.7 mm, it is a/λo = 0.45 and a/λ = 0.72. Therefore in the dielectric region the modes with m=1 are above cutoff, while the modes with m=2 are below cutoff (1/2 < 0.72 < 1).

In the NRD guide, as in the H guide, due to the presence of the dielectric strip the boundary conditions cannot be satisfied by TEM, TM or (m≠0) TE modes with reference to the longitudinal z direction. Thus the modes of the structure will be hybrid, that is with both the longitudinal field components different from zero. Fortunately, the desired mode is a TM mode with reference to the horizontal x direction, along which the equivalent transmission line has been adopted. Therefore, according to the known expressions of the characteristic admittances of the TM modes, it is

$Y_{o}=\frac{\omega \varepsilon _{o}}{k_{xo }} \ \ \ \ Y_{\varepsilon }=\frac{\omega \varepsilon _{o}\varepsilon _{r}}{k_{x\varepsilon }} \ \ \ \ \ (3)$

where

$k_{xo}=-j\left | k_{xo} \right |$

The transverse equivalent network of Fig. 2 is further simplified using the geometrical symmetry of the structure with reference to the middle plane x=0 and considering the polarization of the electric field for the required mode, which is orthogonal vector to the middle plane. In this case, it is possible to bisect the structure with a vertical metallic plane without changing the boundary conditions and thus the internal configuration of the electromagnetic field. This corresponds to a short circuit bisection in the equivalent transmission line, as the simplified network shows in Fig. 3.

Then it is possible to apply the transverse resonance condition along the horizontal x direction expressed by the relation:

$\overleftarrow{Y}+\overrightarrow{Y}=0 \ \ \ \ \ \$

where

$\ \ \ \ \ \ \ \overleftarrow{Y} \ \ \ and \ \ \ \overrightarrow{Y} \ \$

are the admittances looking toward left and right respectively, with reference to an arbitrary section T.

Selecting the reference section as shown in Fig. 3, $\overrightarrow{Y}=Y_{o}$, because the line is infinite toward right. Looking toward left it is

$\overleftarrow{Y}=-jY_{\varepsilon } cot(k_{x\varepsilon }w)$

Then introducing the expression of the characteristic admittances into the resonance condition:

$-jY_{\varepsilon } cot(k_{x\varepsilon }w)+Y_{o}=0$

the dispersion equation is derived:

$-j\varepsilon _{r}k_{xo}cot(k_{x\varepsilon }w )+k_{x\varepsilon }=0 \ \ \ \ (4)$

Moreover, from (1) and (2) one obtains

$k_{xo}=\sqrt{{k_{o}^{2}}-(\frac{m\pi }{a})^{2}-\beta ^{2}}= k_{o}\sqrt{1-(\frac{m\pi }{ak_{o}})^{2}-\frac{\beta ^{2}}{k_{o}}}$

$k_{xo}=\sqrt{{k_{o}^{2}\varepsilon _{r}}-(\frac{m\pi }{a})^{2}-\beta ^{2}}= k_{o}\sqrt{\varepsilon _{r}-(\frac{m\pi }{ak_{o}})^{2}-\frac{\beta ^{2}}{k_{o}}}$

Therefore one can assume the normalized unknown $\frac{\beta }{k_{o}}=\sqrt{\varepsilon _{eff}}$, where $\varepsilon _{eff}$ is the so-called effective relative dielectric constant of the guide.

The cutoff frequency f_{c} is obtained by solving the dispersion equation for β =0.

It is important to notice that, due to the presence of two dielectrics, the solution depends on frequency, that is, the value of β for any frequency cannot be simply obtained from the cutoff frequency, as it would be for one dielectric only, for which: $\beta =\sqrt{k^{2}-k_{t}^{2}}=\sqrt{\omega ^{2}\mu \varepsilon -\omega _{c}^{2}\mu \varepsilon }$ . In our case, instead, it is necessary to solve the dispersion equation, for each value of frequency. In dual manner, TE modes with reference to x can be considered. The expressions for the characteristic admittances are in this case (μ=μ_{o}):

$Y_{o}=\frac{k_{xo}}{\mu _{o}\omega } \ \ \ , \ \ \ \ Y_{\varepsilon }=\frac{k_{x\varepsilon }} {\mu _{o}\omega } \ \ \ \ \ \ \ (5)$

Moreover, in this case the magnetic field is orthogonal to the middle plane x=0. Therefore, it is possible to bisect the structure with a perfect magnetic wall, which corresponds to a bisection with an open circuit, obtaining the circuit shown in Fig. 4. Then, with reference to the T plane, it will be: $\overrightarrow{Y}=Y_{o} \ \ \ , \ \ \ \overleftarrow{Y}=jY_{\varepsilon }tan(k_{x\varepsilon }w)$, from which the dispersion equation is obtained:

$jk_{x\varepsilon }tan(k_{x\varepsilon }w)+k_{xo}=0 \ \ \ (6)$

Obviously, the results, here obtained for the dispersive behavior, could be obtained from the complete transverse equivalent network, without bisections, shown in Fig. 2. In this case, with reference to the T plane, one obtains

$\overrightarrow{Y}=Y_{o} \ \ \ \ \ \ \ \ \overleftarrow{Y}=Y_{\varepsilon }\frac{Y_{o}+jY_{\varepsilon }tan(k_{x\varepsilon }b)}{Y_{\varepsilon }+jY_{o }tan(k_{x\varepsilon }b)}$

and then

$Y_{o}+Y_{\varepsilon }\frac{Y_{o}+jY_{\varepsilon }tan(k_{x\varepsilon }b)}{Y_{\varepsilon }+jY_{o}tan(k_{x\varepsilon }b)}=0 \ \ \ \ \ \ \ \ \ (7)$

This depends on whether TM or TE modes are considered with reference to the x direction, so that Eqs. (3) or (5) can be used for the relevant characteristic admittances.

Then, as previously shown, the transverse resonance method allows us to easily obtain the dispersion equation for the NRD waveguide.

Yet, the electromagnetic field configuration in the three regions has not been considered in details. Further information can be obtained with the method of modal expansion.

== Determination of the hybrid modes ==
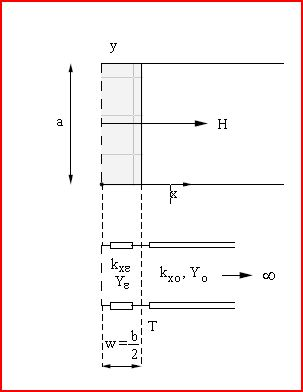
Figure 4

With reference to the cross section of the guide shown in Fig. 1, TM and TE fields can be considered with respect to the z longitudinal direction, along which the guide is uniform. As already said, in NRD waveguide TM or (m≠0) TE modes with reference to the z direction cannot exist, because they cannot satisfy the conditions imposed by the presence of the dielectric slab. Yet, it is known that a propagation mode inside a guiding structure can be expressed as a superposition of a TM field and a TE field with reference to z.

Moreover, the TM field can be derived from a purely longitudinal Lorentz vector potential $\underline{A}$. The electromagnetic field can then be deduced from the general formulae:

$\underline{H}=\triangledown \times \underline{A} \ \ \ \ \ , \ \ \ \ \ \ \underline{E}=-j\omega \mu \underline{A}+\frac{\triangledown\triangledown \cdot \underline{A}}{j\omega \varepsilon } \ \ \ \ \ \ (8)$

In dual manner, the TE field can be derived from a purely longitudinal vector potential $\underline{F}$ . The electromagnetic field is expressed by:

$\underline{E}=-\triangledown \times \underline{F}\ \ \ \ \ \ , \ \ \ \ \ \ \underline{H}=-j\omega \underline{F}+\frac{\triangledown\triangledown \cdot \underline{F}}{j\omega \mu } \ \ \ \ \ \ \ (9)$

Due to the cylindrical symmetry of the structure along the z direction, one can assume:

$\underline{A}=A_{z}\underline{z_{o}}=L^{TM}(z)T^{TM}(x,y)\underline{z_{o}} \ \ \ \ \ \ \ (10)$

$\underline{F}=F_{z}\underline{z_{o}}=L^{TM}(z)T^{TM}(x,y)\underline{z_{o}} \ \ \ \ \ \ (11)$

As it is known, in a sourceless region, the potential must satisfy the homogeneous Helmholtz electromagnetic wave equation:

$\triangledown ^{2}A_{z}+k^{2}A_{z}=0 \ \ \ \ \ \ (12)$

$\triangledown ^{2}F_{z}+k^{2}F_{z}=0 \ \ \ \ \ \ (13)$

From Eqs. (10)-(13), one obtains

$\frac{d^{2}L}{dz^{2}}+k_{z}^{2}L=0 \ \ \ \ \ \ (14)$

$\triangledown _{t}^{2}T+k_{t}^{2}T=0 \ \ \ \ \ \ (15)$

where k_{z} is the wave number in the longitudinal direction,

$\triangledown _{t}^{2}=\triangledown ^{2}-\frac{\partial^2 }{\partial z^2} \ \ \ and \ \ \ k_{t}^{2}=k^{2}-k_{z}^{2}$ .

For the case k_{z} ≠ 0, the general solution of Eq. (14) is given by:

$L(z)=L_{o}^{\dotplus }e^{-jk_{z}z}+L_{o}^{-}e^{jk_{z}z} \ \ \ \ \ \ \ (16)$

In the following suppose that only the direct traveling wave is present (L_{o}^{−} = 0). The wavenumbers k_{y} and k_{z} must be the same in the dielectric as in the air regions in order to satisfy the continuity condition of the tangential field components. Moreover, k_{z} must be the same both in the TM as in the TE fields.

Eq. (15) can be solved by separation of variables. By letting $T (x,y) = X(x) Y(y)$, one obtains

$\frac{d^{2}X}{dx^{2}}+k_{x}^{2}X=0 \ \ \ \ \ \ \ (17)$

$\frac{d^{2}Y}{dy^{2}}+k_{y}^{2}Y=0 \ \ \ \ \ \ \ \ (18)$

where $Y(y)=C_{1}\cos(k_{y}y)+C_{2}sin(k_{y}y)$

For the TM field, the solution of Eq. (18), taking into account the boundary conditions at y = 0 and y = a, is given by:

$sin(\frac{m\pi }{a}y) \ \ \ \ \ (m = 1, 2, 3, ...)$.

For the TE field, one obtains analogously:

$cos(\frac{m\pi }{a}y) \ \ \ \ \ \ (m = 1, 2, 3, ...)$.

As far as Eq. (17) is concerned, the following form is chosen for the general solution:

$X(x)=C_{3}e^{-jk_{x}x}+C_{4}e^{jk_{x}x}$

Therefore, for the various regions assume that:

Dielectric region (-w < x < w)

$T_{\varepsilon }^{TM}=sin(\frac{m\pi }{a}y)\cdot(Ae^{-jk_{x\varepsilon}x }+Be^{jk_{x\varepsilon }x}) \ \ \ \ \ m = 0, 1, 2, ... \ \ \ \ \ \ (19)$

$T_{\varepsilon }^{TE}=cos(\frac{m\pi }{a}y)\cdot(Ce^{-jk_{x\varepsilon}x }+De^{jk_{x\varepsilon }x}) \ \ \ \ \ \ m = 1, 2, 3, ... \ \ \ \ (20)$

where

$k_{x\varepsilon }=k_{o}\sqrt{\varepsilon _{r}-(\frac{m\pi }{k_{o}a})^{2}-(\frac{k_{z}}{k_{o}})^{2}} \ \ \ \ (21)$

Air region on the right (x > w)

$T_{o+}^{TM}=E sin(\frac{m\pi }{a}y)e^{-jk_{xo}(x-w)} \ \ \ \ (22)$

$T_{o+}^{TE}=F cos(\frac{m\pi }{a}y)e^{-jk_{xo}(x-w)} \ \ \ \ \ \ \ \ \ (23)$

Air region on the left (x < w)

$T_{o-}^{TM}=G sin(\frac{m\pi }{a}y)e^{jk_{xo}(x+w)} \ \ \ \ \ \ \ (24)$

$T_{o-}^{TE}=H cos(\frac{m\pi }{a}y)e^{jk_{xo}(x-w)} \ \ \ \ \ \ \ \ (25)$

In the air regions one obtains

$k_{xo}=k_{o}\sqrt{1-(\frac{m\pi }{k_{o}a})^{2}-(\frac{k_{z}}{k_{o}})^{2}} \ \ \ \ \ \ \ (26)$

The eight constants A, B, C, D, E, F, G, H are to be determined by imposing the eight continuity conditions for the tangential components E_{y} , E_{z}, H_{y}, H_{z} of the electromagnetic field at x = w and at x = – w.

The various field components are given by:

$E_{x}=\frac{1}{j\omega \varepsilon }\frac{\mathrm{dL} }{\mathrm{d} z}\frac{\partial T}{\partial x}^{TM}-L\frac{\partial T}{\partial y}^{TE}=\frac{-k_{z}}{\omega \varepsilon }L\frac{\partial T } {\partial x}^{TM}-L\frac{\partial T}{\partial y}^{TE} \ \ \ \ \ \ \ (27)$

$E_{y}=\frac{1}{j\omega \varepsilon }\frac{\mathrm{dL} }{\mathrm{d} z}\frac{\partial T}{\partial y}^{TM}-L\frac{\partial T}{\partial x}^{TE}=\frac{-k_{z}}{\omega \varepsilon }L\frac{\partial T }{\partial y}^{TM}-L\frac{\partial T}{\partial x}^{TE} \ \ \ \ \ \ (28)$

$E_{z}=\frac{k_{t}^{2}}{j\omega \varepsilon } L \ T^{TM}=\frac{k^{2}-k_{z}^{2}}{j\omega \varepsilon } L \ T^{TM} \ \ \ \ \ \ \ (29)$

$H_{x}=L\frac{\partial T }{\partial y}^{TM}+\frac{1} {j\omega \mu }\frac{\mathrm{dL} }{\mathrm{d} z}\frac{\partial T}{\partial x}^{TE}= L \frac{\partial T }{\partial y}^{TM}-\frac{k_{z}}{\omega \mu }L \frac{\partial T}{\partial x}^{TE} \ \ \ \ \ (30)$

$H_{y}=- L\frac{\partial T }{\partial x}^{TM}+\frac{1}{j\omega \mu }\frac{\mathrm{dL} }{\mathrm{d} z}\frac{\partial T}{\partial y}^{TE}= - L \frac{\partial T }{\partial x}^{TM}-\frac{k_{z}} {\omega \mu }L \frac{\partial T}{\partial y}^{TE} \ \ \ \ (31)$

$H_{z}=\frac{k_{t}^{2}}{j\omega \mu } L \ T^{TE}=\frac{k^{2}-k_{z}^{2}}{j\omega \mu } L \ T^{TE} \ \ \ \ (32)$

Imposing the continuity conditions at each interface, it is

$-\frac{k_{z}}{\omega \varepsilon _{o}}\frac{\partial T_{o}}{\partial y}^{TM}+\frac{\partial T_{o}}{\partial x}^{TE}= -\frac{k_{z}}{\omega \varepsilon _{o}\varepsilon _{r}}\frac{\partial T_{\varepsilon } }{\partial y}^{TM}+\frac{\partial T_{\varepsilon }}{\partial x}^{TE}$

$\frac{k_{o}^{2}-k_{z}^{2}}{j\omega \varepsilon _{o}} \ T_{o}^{TM} =\frac{k_{o}^{2}\varepsilon _{r}-k_{z}^{2}}{j\omega \varepsilon _{r}\varepsilon _{o}} T_{\varepsilon }^{TM}$

$-\frac{\partial T_{o}}{\partial x}^{TM}-\frac{k_{z}}{\omega \mu }\frac{\partial T_{o}}{\partial y}^{TE}= -\frac{\partial T_{\varepsilon }}{\partial x}^{TM}-\frac{k_{z}}{\omega \mu }\frac{\partial T_{\varepsilon } }{\partial y}^{TE}$

$\frac{k_{o}^{2}-k_{z}^{2}}{j\omega \mu} \ T_{o}^{TE} =\frac{k_{o}^{2}\varepsilon _{r}-k_{z}^{2}}{j\omega \mu }^{TE}$

where the first members are referred to the air-regions, and the second members to the dielectric-region.

Introducing equations (19), (20), and (22)-(25) in the four continuity conditions at x = w, the E and F constants can be expressed in terms of A, B, C, D, which are linked by two relations.

Similarly at the interface x = -w, the G and H constants can be expressed in terms of A, B, C, D. Then the expressions of the electromagnetic field components become:

Dielectric region (-w < x < w)

$E_{x}=\left [ j\frac{k_{x\varepsilon }k_{z}}{\omega \varepsilon _{o}\varepsilon _{r}}(Ae^{-jk_{x\varepsilon }x}-Be^{jk_{x\varepsilon }x})+ \frac{m\pi }{a}(Ce^{-jk_{x\varepsilon }x}+De^{jk_{x\varepsilon }x}) \right ]sin(\frac{m\pi }{a}y)e^{-jk_{z}z} \ \ \ \ \ \ (33)$

$E_{y}=\left [- \frac{k_{z}}{\omega \varepsilon _{o}\varepsilon _{r}}\frac{m\pi }{a}(Ae^{-jk_{x\varepsilon }x}+Be^{jk_{x\varepsilon }x})-jk_{x\varepsilon }(Ce^{-jk_{x\varepsilon }x}-De^{jk_{x\varepsilon }x}) \right ]cos(\frac{m\pi }{a}y)e^{-jk_{z}z} \ \ \ \ \ \ \ (34)$

$E_{z}=\frac{k_{o}^{2}\varepsilon _{r}-k_{z}^{2}}{j\omega \varepsilon _{o}\varepsilon _{r}}(Ae^{-jk_{x\varepsilon }x}-Be^{jk_{x\varepsilon }x})sin(\frac{m\pi }{a}y)e^{-jk_{z}z} \ \ \ \ \ \ (35)$

$H_{x}=\left [ \frac{m\pi }{a}(Ae^{-jk_{x\varepsilon }x}+Be^{jk_{x\varepsilon }x}) + j\frac{k_{x\varepsilon }k_{z}}{\omega \mu}(Ce^{-jk_{x\varepsilon }x}-De^{jk_{x\varepsilon }x}) \right ]cos(\frac{m\pi }{a}y)e^{-jk_{z}z} \ \ \ \ \ \ \ (36)$

$H_{y}=\left [jk_{x\varepsilon }(Ae^{-jk_{x\varepsilon }x}-Be^{jk_{x\varepsilon }x})+\frac{k_{z}}{\omega \mu}\frac{m\pi }{a}(Ce^{-jk_{x\varepsilon }x}+De^{jk_{x\varepsilon }x}) \right ]sin(\frac{m\pi }{a}y)e^{-jk_{z}z} \ \ \ \ \ \ \ (37)$

$H_{z}=\frac{k_{o}^{2}\varepsilon _{r}-k_{z}^{2}}{j\omega \mu}(Ce^{-jk_{x\varepsilon }x}+De^{jk_{x\varepsilon }x})cos(\frac{m\pi }{a}y)e^{-jk_{z}z} \ \ \ \ \ \ \ \ \ \ \ (38)$

Air region on the right (x > w)

$E_{x}=\frac{k_{o}^{2}\varepsilon _{r}-k_{z}^{2}}{k_{o}^{2}-k_{z}^{2}}[\frac{jk_{xo}k_{z}}{\omega \varepsilon _{o}\varepsilon_{r} }(A \ e^{-jk_{x\varepsilon }w}+B \ e^{jk_{x\varepsilon }w})+\frac{m\pi }{a}(C \ e^{-jk_{x\varepsilon }w}+D \ e^{jk_{x\varepsilon }w})]e^{-jk_{xo}(x-w)}sin(\frac{m\pi }{a}y)e^{-jk_{z}z} \ \ \ \ \ \ \ \ (39)$

$E_{y}=\frac{k_{o}^{2}\varepsilon _{r}-k_{z}^{2}}{k_{o}^{2}-k_{z}^{2}}[-\frac{k_{z}}{\omega \varepsilon _{o}\varepsilon_{r} }\frac{m\pi }{a}(A \ e^{-jk_{x\varepsilon }w}+B \ e^{jk_{x\varepsilon }w})-jk_{xo}(C \ e^{-jk_{x\varepsilon }w}+D \ e^{jk_{x\varepsilon }w})]e^{-jk_{xo}(x-w)}cos(\frac{m\pi }{a}y)e^{-jk_{z}z} \ \ \ \ \ \ (40)$

$E_{z}=\frac{k_{o}^{2}\varepsilon _{r}-k_{z}^{2}}{j\omega \varepsilon _{o}\varepsilon _{r}}(A \ e^{-jk_{x\varepsilon }w}+B \ e^{jk_{x\varepsilon }w})e^{-jk_{xo}(x-w)}sin(\frac{m\pi }{a}y)e^{-jk_{z}z} \ \ \ \ \ (41)$

$H_{x}=\frac{k_{o}^{2}\varepsilon _{r}-k_{z}^{2}}{k_{o}^{2}-k_{z}^{2}}[\frac{m\pi }{a}\frac{1}{\varepsilon _{r}}(A \ e^{-jk_{x\varepsilon }w}+B \ e^{jk_{x\varepsilon }w})+\frac{jk_{xo}k_{z}}{\omega \mu }(C \ e^{-jk_{x\varepsilon }w}+D \ e^{jk_{x\varepsilon }w})]e^{-jk_{xo}(x-w)}cos(\frac{m\pi }{a}y)e^{-jk_{z}z} \ \ \ \ \ \ \ (42)$

$H_{y}=\frac{k_{o}^{2}\varepsilon _{r}-k_{z}^{2}} {k_{o}^{2}-k_{z}^{2}}[j\frac{k_{xo}}{\varepsilon _{r}}(A \ e^{-jk_{x\varepsilon }w}+B \ e^{jk_{x\varepsilon }w})+\frac{k_{z}}{\omega \mu }\frac{m\pi }{a}(C \ e^{-jk_{x\varepsilon }w}+D \ e^{jk_{x\varepsilon }w})]e^{-jk_{x0}(x-w)}sin(\frac{m\pi }{a}y)e^{-jk_{z}z} \ \ \ \ \ \ (43)$

$H_{z}=\frac{k_{o}^{2}\varepsilon _{r}-k_{z}^{2}}{j\omega \mu}(C \ e^{-jk_{x\varepsilon }w}+D \ e^{jk_{x\varepsilon }w})e^{-jk_{xo}(x-w)}cos(\frac{m\pi }{a}y)e^{-jk_{z}z} \ \ \ \ \ (44)$

Air region on the left (x < -w)

$E_{x}=\frac{k_{o}^{2}\varepsilon _{r}-k_{z}^{2}}{k_{o}^{2}-k_{z}^{2}}[\frac{-jk_{xo}k_{z}}{\omega \varepsilon _{o}\varepsilon_{r} }(A \ e^{jk_{x\varepsilon }w}+B \ e^{-jk_{x\varepsilon }w})+\frac{m\pi }{a}(C \ e^{jk_{x\varepsilon }w}+D \ e^{-jk_{x\varepsilon }w})]e^{jk_{xo}(x+w)}sin(\frac{m\pi }{a}y)e^{-jk_{z}z} \ \ \ \ \ \ \ \ (45)$

$E_{y}=\frac{k_{o}^{2}\varepsilon _{r}-k_{z}^{2}}{k_{o}^{2}-k_{z}^{2}}[-\frac{k_{z}}{\omega \varepsilon _{o}\varepsilon_{r} }\frac{m\pi }{a}(A \ e^{jk_{x\varepsilon }w}+B \ e^{-jk_{x\varepsilon }w})-jk_{xo}(C \ e^{jk_{x\varepsilon }w}+D \ e^{-jk_{x\varepsilon }w})]e^{jk_{xo}(x+w)}cos(\frac{m\pi }{a}y)e^{-jk_{z}z} \ \ \ \ \ \ (46)$

$E_{z}=\frac{k_{o}^{2}\varepsilon _{r}-k_{z}^{2}}{j\omega \varepsilon _{o}\varepsilon _{r}}(A \ e^{jk_{x\varepsilon }w}+B \ e^{-jk_{x\varepsilon }w})e^{-jk_{xo}(x+w)}sin(\frac{m\pi }{a}y)e^{-jk_{z}z} \ \ \ \ \ (47)$

$H_{x}=\frac{k_{o}^{2}\varepsilon _{r}-k_{z}^{2}}{k_{o}^{2}-k_{z}^{2}}[\frac{m\pi }{a}\frac{1}{\varepsilon _{r}}(A \ e^{jk_{x\varepsilon }w}+B \ e^{-jk_{x\varepsilon }w})-\frac{jk_{xo}k_{z}}{\omega \mu }(C \ e^{jk_{x\varepsilon }w}+D \ e^{-jk_{x\varepsilon }w})]e^{jk_{xo}(x+w)}cos(\frac{m\pi }{a}y)e^{-jk_{z}z} \ \ \ \ \ \ \ (48)$

$H_{y}=\frac{k_{o}^{2}\varepsilon _{r}-k_{z}^{2}} {k_{o}^{2}-k_{z}^{2}}[-j\frac{k_{xo}}{\varepsilon _{r}}(A \ e^{jk_{x\varepsilon }w}+B \ e^{-jk_{x\varepsilon }w})+\frac{k_{z}}{\omega \mu }\frac{m\pi }{a}(C \ e^{jk_{x\varepsilon }w}+D \ e^{-jk_{x\varepsilon }w})]e^{jk_{xo}(x+w)}sin(\frac{m\pi }{a}y)e^{-jk_{z}z} \ \ \ \ \ \ (49)$

$H_{z}=\frac{k_{o}^{2}\varepsilon _{r}-k_{z}^{2}}{j\omega \mu}(C \ e^{jk_{x\varepsilon }w}+D \ e^{-jk_{x\varepsilon }w})e^{jk_{xo}(x+w)}cos(\frac{m\pi }{a}y)e^{-jk_{z}z} \ \ \ \ \ (50)$

These expressions are not directly provided by the transverse resonance method.

Finally, from the remaining continuity conditions a homogeneous system of four equations in the four unknowns A, B, C, D, is obtained. Non-trivial solutions are found by imposing that the determinant of the coefficients vanishes. In this way, by using equation (21) and (26) the dispersion equation, which gives the possible value for the longitudinal propagation constant k_{z} for the various modes, is obtained.

Then, the unknowns A, B, C, D can be found, apart from an arbitrary factor.

In order to obtain the cutoff frequencies of the various modes it is sufficient to set k_{z}=0 in the determinant and solve the equation, which is now strongly simplified, with reference to frequency. A similar simplification does not occur when using the transverse resonance method since k_{z} only implicitly appears; then the equations to be solved in order to obtain the cutoff frequencies are formally the same.

A simpler analysis, expanding again the field as a superposition of modes, can be obtained taking into account the electric field orientation for the required mode and bisecting the structure with a perfectly conducting wall, as it has been done in Fig. 3. In this case, there are only two regions, only six unknowns have to be determined and the continuity conditions are also six (continuity of E_{y}, E_{z}, H_{y}, H_{z} for x = w and the vanishing of E_{y}, E_{z} for x=0).

Finally it is important to notice that the resulting dispersion equation is factorizable in the product of two expressions, that coincide with the dispersion equation for the TE and TM modes with reference to the x direction, respectively. Thus all the solutions belong to these two classes of modes.
