= Yiddish grammar =

Structure of the Yiddish language

Yiddish grammar is the system of principles which govern the structure of the Yiddish language. This article describes the standard form laid out by YIVO while noting differences in significant dialects such as that of many contemporary Hasidim. As a Germanic language descended from Middle High German, Yiddish grammar is fairly similar to that of German, though it also has numerous linguistic innovations as well as grammatical features influenced by or borrowed from Hebrew, Aramaic, and various Slavic languages.

== Nouns ==
=== Gender ===
Yiddish nouns are classified into one of three grammatical genders: masculine (זכר zokher), feminine (נקבֿה nekeyve) and neuter (נײטראַל neytral). To a large extent, the gender of a noun is unpredictable, though there are some regular patterns:

- nouns denoting specifically male humans and animals are usually masculine, and nouns denoting specifically female humans and animals are usually feminine
- nouns ending in an unstressed schwa are usually feminine
- nouns built on most of the common abstract noun suffixes, such as ־ונג -ung, ־קײט -keyt, and ־הײט -heyt, are feminine
- diminutive nouns with the suffix ־ל -l or ־עלע -ele are neuter in the standard language

Gender assignment for new words and sporadic realignments of older ones are examples of the dynamic tendency observable for nouns that do not reflect an inherent sex. It designates nouns with vowel endings as feminine and those with consonant endings as masculine.

=== Case ===
There are three grammatical cases in Yiddish: nominative, accusative and dative. The nominative case generally is used for the subject, the accusative for the direct object and the dative for an indirect object or object of a preposition. Nouns are normally not inflected for case, and case is indicated by the inflection of a related definite article or adjective. However, a handful of nouns do have inflectional endings to indicate the accusative and/or dative cases, which may be optional or obligatory, depending on the specific lexical item and dialect; examples of nouns that take obligatory case endings include certain kinship terms (טאַטע tate 'father', מאַמע mame 'mother'), the words ייִד yid 'Jew' and האַרץ harts 'heart'. In those cases, masculine nouns take the ending ן- -n in the accusative and dative singular, i.e. טאַטן tatn 'father', רבין rebn 'rabbi' or 'teacher'; feminine and neuter nouns take ן- -n only in the dative singular, where, for example, מאַמע mame becomes מאַמען mamen. Names of people are also inflected, i.e. משה Moyshe becomes משהן Moyshen and יאַנקל Yankl becomes יאַנקלען Yanklen. This also applies to names incorporating biblical titles, such as אליהו הנבֿיא Eliohu HaNovi 'Elijah the Prophet', which becomes אליהו הנבֿיאן Eliohu HaNovin. Both first and last names can be inflected on their own, but in cases where both names are together, only the surname is inflected.

Yiddish does not have a genitive case per se. However, when the possessor is a human or occasionally other living beings, possession may be indicated with a suffixed ס- -s to the noun (like English possessive -'s) with any modifiers in the dative case. Otherwise, possession is normally indicated by the preposition פֿון fun 'of'.

Another genitive-like construction, the quantitative, is used to describe quantities of objects: אַ פֿול גלאָז הייסע טיי a ful gloz heyse tey (a full cup of hot tea); אַ גרופּע יונגע מענטשן a grupe yunge mentshn (a group of young people). The noun phrase representing the quantity is simply followed by noun representing the object described. This construction may not be used if the object has a definite article: אַ פֿול גלאָז מיט דער הײסער טײ a ful gloz mit der heyser tey (a full cup of the hot tea).

=== Plural ===
There are two regular plural suffixes. For nouns ending in an unstressed vowel, the plural is regularly formed with the suffix -s; e.g., the plural of גרופּע grupe 'group' is גרופּעס grupes. For nouns ending in a consonant, the plural is regularly formed with -n; the plural of טיש tish 'table' is טישן tishn.

A vast number of nouns use irregular plural forms, including -es (these are usually nouns of Slavic origin) and -er with a kind of apophony called Germanic umlaut (e.g., מאַן man 'man' → מענער mener 'men'; קינד kind 'child' → קינדער kinder 'children'), or umlaut alone (e.g., האַנט hant 'hand' → הענט hent 'hands'). Some words do not change in the plural (e.g., פֿיש fish 'fish'). Nouns built on the diminutive suffixes -l and -ele form the plural in -ekh (e.g., מײדל meydl 'girl' → מײדלעך meydlekh 'girls'), mirroring some German dialects in this regard.

Most words of Hebrew origin use the Hebrew plural suffixes, either -im (e.g., ספֿר seyfer 'holy book' → ספֿרים sforim 'holy books') or -es (e.g., סוד sod 'secret' → סודות soydes 'secrets'). As these examples show, many plurals of Hebrew origin also involve an apophony of Hebrew origin. Not all words of Hebrew origin form their plurals in the same way they do in Hebrew: in particular, Hebrew feminine nouns ending in -ת tend to become masculine in Yiddish, and take the -im plural suffix, avoiding the uneuphonic ending *-ses: e.g. שבת shabes 'Shabbat' → Yiddish שבתים shabosim, not the expected *שבתות *shaboses. This tendency also extends to cases when the Hebrew plural ends in -yes rather than -ses: e.g. תּכלית takhles 'purpose' → Hebrew תּכליות takhliyes, Yiddish תּכליתים takhleysim. Other words of Hebrew origin form a Germanic plural, e.g., קול kol 'voice' has the plural קולער keler, formed with the Germanic -er suffix and umlaut. Finally, there are a few words of non-Hebrew origin that take Hebrew plural suffixes, such as דאָקטער dokter 'doctor' → דאָקטוירים doktoyrim, פּױער poyer 'farmer' → פּױערים poyerim.

== Articles ==
The definite article agrees in gender, number and case with the noun it is used with.

Yiddish definite article
Definite article ("The")	Singular			Plural
Definite article ("The")	Masculine	Neuter	Feminine	Plural
Nominative	דער der	דאָס dos	די di	די di
Accusative	דעם dem	דאָס dos	די di	די di
Dative	דעם dem	דעם dem	דער der	די di

The indefinite article is אַ a, which becomes אַן an before a word beginning with a vowel sound. Yiddish, like English, does not have a plural indefinite article.

== Adjectives ==
Attributive adjectives—that is, those that directly modify a noun—are inflected to agree with the gender, number and case of the noun they modify, while predicate adjectives remain uninflected. For example, one says דער גוטער מאַן der guter man 'the good man', but דער מאַן איז גוט Der man iz gut 'The man is good'. When an adjective is used absolutively—that is, to stand as the head of a noun phrase as if it were itself a noun—it is inflected as if it were followed by a noun: דער מאַן איז אַ גוטער Der man iz a guter 'The man is a good [one]'. Neuter singular adjectives are in some respects exceptional; in attributive position, they have no case ending unless their noun phrase is introduced by the definite article; in absolutive position, they use the distinctive suffix -s in the nominative and accusative cases.

Yiddish adjective declension
גוט Gut "good"	Singular										Plural	
גוט Gut "good"	Masculine		Neuter						Feminine		Plural	
גוט Gut "good"	Masculine		Indefinite		Definite		Absolutive		Feminine		Plural	
Nominative	גוטער guter	ער- -er	גוט gut	-_	גוטע gute	ע- -e	גוטס guts	ס- -s	גוטע gute	ע- -e	גוטע gute	ע- -e
Accusative	גוטן gutn	ן- -n	גוט gut	-_	גוטע gute	ע- -e	גוטס guts	ס- -s	גוטע gute	ע- -e	גוטע gute	ע- -e
Dative	גוטן gutn	ן- -n	גוטן gutn	ן- -n	גוטן gutn	ן- -n	גוטן gutn	ן- -n	גוטער guter	ער- -er	גוטע gute	ע- -e

The ending -n becomes -en after an m, or a stressed vowel or diphthong; it becomes -em after n and, as an exception, in the adjective nay (new). Yiddish is slightly simpler than German in that German -m and -n are both -n in Yiddish (or, in the case of the definite article, dem), and Yiddish does not have a genitive case. The "definite" and "absolutive" versions of the neuter gender are a relic of the strong vs. weak adjective endings of German (das gute Bier vs. gutes Bier).

A class of pronominal adjectives, including אײן eyn 'one', קײן keyn 'none', and possessive pronouns such as מײַן mayn 'my, mine' and זײַן zayn 'his', display behavior opposite to that of ordinary adjectives: they are inflected for gender, number and case when used predicatively but not when used attributively. (Absolutively, they behave as normal adjectives).

Adjectives normally precede the nouns, but they may follow the nouns as an absolutive construction for stylistic purposes: אַ שײנע פֿרױ a sheyne froy or אַ פֿרױ אַ שײנע a froy a sheyne ('a beautiful woman').

== Pronouns ==
Yiddish personal pronouns
Personal pronouns	1st person		2nd person			3rd person			
Personal pronouns	Singular	Plural	Singular/ informal	Singular formal/ Plural	Plural informal	Singular			Plural
Personal pronouns	Singular	Plural	Singular/ informal	Standard	Polish	Masculine	Neuter	Feminine	Plural
Nominative	איך ikh	מיר mir	דו du	איר ir	עץ ets	ער er	עס es	זי zi	זײ zey
Accusative	מיך mikh	אונדז undz	דיך dikh	אײַך aykh	ענק enk	אים im	עס es	זי zi	זײ zey
Dative	מיר mir	אונדז undz	דיר dir	אײַך aykh	ענק enk	אים im	אים im	איר ir	זײ zey

Third person pronouns agree in gender with the noun they refer to. Thus, even inanimate objects should be referred to as er or zi if they are masculine or feminine. Neuter nouns receive es. A minority of speakers of the Northeastern dialect of Yiddish uses the dative forms of the single personal pronouns. A T–V distinction, or the use of the 2nd plural form ir for a single addressee for reasons of respect, is archaic in YiVO Yiddish, but appears historically and in many colloquial varieties.

== Verbs ==
=== Verb inflection ===
Yiddish verbs are conjugated for person (first, second, and third) and number (singular and plural) in the present tense. In the imperative, they conjugate only for number. Nonfinite verb forms are the infinitive and the past participle.

The infinitive of a verb is formed with the suffix ן- -n (which takes the form ען- -en in certain phonological contexts). The imperative uses the base form of the verb with no affixes in the singular, and takes the suffix ט- -t in the plural. In the present tense, the first-person singular takes the base form of the verb; the other person/number combinations are regularly inflected according to the following table:

Yiddish present tense
person	singular	plural	
1st	–	ן- -n	
2nd	סט- -st	ט- -t	טס- -ts
3rd	ט- -t	ן- -n	

A present participle, functioning as a derived adjective or adverb, is regularly constructed by adding the suffix דיק- -dik to the infinitive.

==== Past participle ====
The past participle is used extensively in Yiddish. The majority of verbs (weak verbs) form the past participle by adding the prefix -גע ge- and the suffix ט- -t to the stem, e.g. געקויפֿט gekoyft 'bought'. However, strong verbs form the past participle with -גע ge- and ן- -n, usually accompanied by a vowel change, e. g. געהאָלפֿן geholfn 'helped' from the stem -העלפֿ helf- 'help'. The vowel change is unpredictable, and there is no way to tell from the infinitive whether a verb is weak or strong.

The prefix -גע ge- is omitted in past participles of verbs whose first syllable does not bear primary stress. There are two classes of verbs for which this happens: verbs with one of several unstressed stem prefixes, such as -פֿאַר far- or -באַ ba-; and verbs built on the stressed suffix יר- -ir, usually used for loanwords. Thus the past participles of פֿאַרקױפֿן farkoyfn 'to sell' and אַבאָנירן abonirn 'to subscribe' are, respectively, merely פֿאַרקױפֿט farkoyft and אַבאָנירט abonirt.

Some participles vary between dialects and registers; for example, געװען geven is the usual past participle of זײַן zayn 'to be', but געװעזן gevezn (normally an adjective meaning 'former') may be used as the past participle in a "Daytshmerish" דײַטשמעריש (Standard German–imitating) register.

==== Examples of conjugation ====
The table below shows the inflection of various Yiddish verbs. Most verbs are generally regular, with irregularities occurring predominantly in the past participle.

Yiddish verb inflection
Verb inflection				Regular verbs		Irregular verbs						
Verb inflection				קױפֿן Koyfn		געבן Gebn	האָבן Hobn	טאָן Ton	װעלן Veln		וויסן Visn	זײַן Zayn
Verb inflection				to buy		to give	to have	to do	to want	future tense	to know	to be
Infinitive				קױפֿן koyfn	ן- -n	געבן gebn	האָבן hobn	טאָן ton	וועלן veln		װיסן visn	זײַן zayn
Present Participle				קױפֿנדיק koyfndik	נדיק- ndik	געבנדיק gebndik	האָבנדיק hobndik	טוענדיק tuendik	װעלנדיק velndik		װיסנדיק visndik	זײַענדיק zayendik
Past Participle				געקױפֿט gekoyft	גע- -ט ge -t	געגעבן gegebn	געהאַט gehat	געטאָן geton	געוואָלט gevolt		געװוּסט gevust	געװען geven
Present	Singular	1st person		קױף koyf	-_	גיב gib	האָב hob	טו tu	װיל vil	װעל vel	װײס veys	בין bin
Present	Singular	2nd person		קױפֿסט koyfst	סט- -st	גיסט gist	האָסט host	טוסט tust	װילסט vilst	װעסט vest	װײסט veyst	ביסט bist
Present	Singular	3rd person		קױפֿט koyft	ט- -t	גיט git	האָט hot	טוט tut	װיל vil	װעט vet	װײס veys	איז iz
Present	Plural	1st person		קױפֿן koyfn	ן- -n	גיבן gibn	האָבן hobn	טוען tuen	װילן viln	װעלן veln	װײסן veysn	זענען zenen
Present	Plural	2nd person	Standard	קױפֿט koyft	ט- -t	גיט git	האָט hot	טוט tut	װילט vilt	װעט vet	װײסט veyst	זענט zent
Present	Plural	2nd person	Polish	קויפֿטס koyfts	טס- -ts	גיטס gits	האָטס hots	טוטס tuts	װילטס vilts	װעטס vets	װײסטס veysts	זענטס zents
Present	Plural	3rd person		קױפֿן koyfn	ן- -n	גיבן gibn	האָבן hobn	טוען tuen	װילן viln	װעלן veln	װײסן veysn	זענען zenen
Imperative	Singular			קױף koyf	-_	גיב gib	האָב hob	טו tu				זײַ zay
Imperative	Plural		Standard	קױפֿט koyft	ט- -t	גיט git	האָט hot	טוט tut				זײַט zayt
Imperative	Plural		Polish	קױפֿטס koyfts	טס- -ts	גיטס gits	האָטס hots	טוטס tuts				זײַטס

The following table shows some additional irregular past participles:

Yiddish irregular past participles
Verb		Past participle		Notes
Word	Meaning	Word	Meaning	Notes
בלײַבן Blaybn	to continue; to stay, remain	געבליבן geblibn	continued, remaining	
ברעכן Brekhn	to break; to wring; to vomit	געבראָכן gebrokhn	broken	
ברענגען Brengen	to bring	געבראַכט gebrakht	brought	Regular weak form געברענגט gebrengt also in use
עסן Esn	to eat	געגעסן gegesn	eaten	
געלינגען Gelingen	to succeed	געלונגען gelungen	succeeded	Goes with the dative
געװינען Gevinen	to win	געװוּנען gevunen	won	געװאָנען is also used.
גײן Geyn	to go, walk	געגאַנגען gegangen	gone	
הײבן Heybn	to lift, raise	געהױבן gehoybn	lifted	
קלײַבן Klaybn	to choose; to gather	געקליבן geklibn	chosen, gathered	
לױפֿן Loyfn	to run, hurry	געלאָפֿן gelofn	ran, hurried	
נעמען בײַ Nemen bay	to get, take	גענומען genumen	taken, gotten	
ניסן Nisn	to sneeze	גענאָסן genosn	sneezed	
רײַסן Raysn	to rip, tear	געריסן gerisn	torn, ripped	
שענקען Shenken	to give, grant	געשאָנקען geshonken	given, granted	
שערן Shern	to cut, shear	געשױרן geshoyrn, געשאָרן geshorn	shorn	
שיסן Shisn	to shoot	געשאָסן geshosn	shot	
שלײַפֿן Shlayfn	to hone, sharpen	געשליפֿען geshlifen	honed, sharpened	
שליסן Shlisn	to close, lock	געשלאָסן geshlosn	closed, locked	
שמײַסן Shmaysn	to whip, flog	געשמיסן geshmisn	whipped	
שמעלצן Shmeltzn	to melt	געשמאָלצן geshmoltzn	melted, molten	
שפּײַען Shpayen	to spit, spew	געשפּיגן geshpign	spitten, spewn	
שרײַבן Shraybn	to write	געשריבן geshribn	written	
שטאַרבן Shtarbn	to die	געשטאָרבן geshtorbn	dead	
שטײן Shteyn	to stand	געשטאַנען geshtanen	stood	
שװימען Shvimen	to swim	געשװוּמען geshvumen	swum	
טרײַבן Traybn	to drive	געטריבן getribn	driven	
ציִען Tzien	to pull	געצױגן getzoygn	pulled	
װערן Vern	to become	געװאָרן gevorn	became	
זינגען Zingen	to sing	געזונגען gezungen	sang	
זיצן Zitzn	to sit	געזעסן gezesn	sat	געזעצן gezetzn is also used.

=== Separable verbs ===
Like German, Yiddish has a family of separable verbs. These are verb stems co-occurring with a particle that sometimes occurs as a prefix attached to the verb stem and sometimes as a separate word. The particle appears separate from the verb in the present tense, but is attached as a prefix in the infinitive and participle. For example, in אויסזאָגן oyszogn 'to reveal', the particle אױס oys is attached to the verb; but in the present tense זאָגט אױס zogt oys 'reveals', the particle appears as a separate word. In the past participle, the particle appears before the prefix ge-, as in אױסגעזאָגט oysgezogt 'revealed'.

The same grammatical structure of separable verbs is used for a class called "periphrastic verbs". In these, the uninflected particle, often a loanword from Hebrew, carries the main meaning, and it is accompanied by an inflected light verb. For example, in תּשובֿה טאָן tshuve ton 'repent', the word תּשובֿה tshuve is a Hebrew loanword meaning 'repentance', acting grammatically as a particle accompanying the verb טאָן ton 'do'.

The periphrastic-verb construction mechanism allows Yiddish to borrow many Hebrew verbs and verbal constructions. Present-participle forms of active Hebrew verbs are used as particles accompanying the light verb זײַן (zayn 'be'), while present participles of passive Hebrew verbs accompany the light verb װערן (vern 'become'):

- מסכּים זײַן (maskem zayn 'to agree')
- קונה־שם זײַן (koyne-shem zayn 'to gain popularity')
- נעלם װערן (nelm vern 'to disappear')
- זיך נתגלגל װערן (zikh nisgalgl vern 'to reincarnate')

The Hebrew verb paradigm nispoel (standard Hebrew nitpael), marginalized in Modern Hebrew due to its overlap with hitpael, is much more common in Yiddish. Hence the word for "to be impressed" is נתפּעל װערן nispoel vern, as opposed to מתפּעל װערן as a Modern Hebrew speaker might expect.

=== Auxiliary-verb constructions ===
Like other varieties of High German and unlike literary German, Yiddish does not have the inflected past tense (preterite). Instead, the auxiliary verbs האָבן hobn 'to have' or זײַן zayn 'to be' are used with the past participle of the verb to construct the past tense. Most verbs take האָבן hobn; for example, the past tense of איך קױף ikh koyf 'I buy' is איך האָב געקױפֿט ikh hob gekoyft 'I bought'. About 30 intransitive verbs of motion or status and some of their derivatives take זײַן zayn; e.g., the past tense of איך קום ikh kum 'I come' is איך בין געקומען ikh bin gekumen 'I came'. Transitive derivatives of these exceptional verbs usually take האָבן hobn: e.g., זײַן zayn is used with the intransitive גײן geyn 'go', but האָבן hobn is used with the derived transitive separable verb איבערגײן ibergeyn 'go across'.

The future tense in Yiddish is formed with a special auxiliary verb װעלן veln followed by the infinitive. As shown in the table above, its inflection is irregular.

The pluperfect is formed by adding the modifier געהאַט gehat (the past participle of האָבן hobn 'have') to the past tense: איך האָב געהאַט געזאָגט ikh hob gehat gezogt ('I had said'); איר זענט געהאַט געגאַנגען ir zent gehat gegangen (you had gone). The Future perfect tense is formed with the future tense auxiliary followed by the auxiliary verb האָבן and the participle of the verb: איך װעל האָבן געזאָגט ikh vel hobn gezogt (I will have said). These tenses are both very infrequent, especially in the spoken language. When the context makes the previousness of action clear, the ordinary past or future is used instead, and usually with an adverb such as שױן shoyn (already) or פֿריִער friër (earlier).

The auxiliary verb פֿלעגן (flegn), in combination with the infinitive (or participle, in some dialects), is used to form a habitual past aspect: for example, איך פֿלעג קומען ikh fleg kumen (I used to come).

The auxiliary װאָלט (volt), accompanying the past participle, is used to form a conditional mood: איך װאָלט געגאַנגען ikh volt gegangen 'I would have gone'.

=== Other aspectual constructions ===
A "momentaneous" aspect, expressing a one-time action, an action done quickly, or an action done surprisingly, may be formed by the light verbs טאָן (ton, 'do') or געבן (gebn, 'give') followed by an indefinite article and the verb stem (identical to the first person singular form of most verbs), while superficially similar to something like English's 'have a look', the syntax is generally different between this aspect and an actual sentence with two objects.

For example: איך האָב געגעבן אַ בוך דער מאַמען ikh hob gegebn a bukh der mamen ('I gave my mother a book'), which can be contrasted with איך האָב אַ קוק אָן געגעבן די מאַמע ikh hob a kuk on gegebn di mame ('I looked at my mother').

Verb stems which have homophonous nouns, such as קוש kush ('kiss') may use the normal noun syntax and take adjectives. For example: די מאַמע האָט מיך געגעבן אַ קוש di mame hot mikh gegebn a kush ('My mom kissed me (once)')

Further examples: זי האָט אים אַ כאַפּ אָן געטאָן zi hot im a khap on geton ('she grabbed him [lit. she did him a grab on]'); מיר גיבן אַ שרײַ אויס mir gibn a shray oys ('we screamed out (at once) [lit. we give a scream out]').

The perfective aspect—indicating a completed action in the past or one whose completion is contemplated in the future—can be formed by adding a prefix or separable particle to many verbs. For example, the verb לײענען leyenen 'read' may be made perfective with the separable particle איבער iber or דורך durkh. Thus איך האָב געלייענט ikh hob geleyent means 'I read', 'I was reading'; while איך האָב איבערגעלייענט or איך האָב דורכגעלייענט ikh hob ibergeleyent / ikh hob durkhgeleyent means 'I read entirely', 'I read through'. Further examples:

- ער װעט שרײַבן er vet shraybn 'he will write', 'he will do some writing'
  ער וועט אָנשרײַבן er vet onshraybn 'he will write completely', 'he will write up', 'he will get (something) written'
- מיר לערנען זיך פֿראַנצײזיש mir lernen zikh frantseyzish 'we are studying French', 'we are taking French'
  מיר ווילן זיך אויסלערנען פֿראַנצייזיש mir viln zikh oyslernen frantseyzish 'we want to learn French thoroughly'

The most common perfectivizing elements are the particles דורך ,איבער ,אָן ,אָפּ ,אױס (oys, op, on, iber, durkh) and the prefixes דער־ and צו־ (der-, tsu-), but there are no definitive rules for determining which of these are used with which verbs.

Various other aspects, generally paralleling the complex aspect system of the Slavic languages, are formed by auxiliary verbs or prefixes, sometimes combined with the reflexive particle זיך (zikh). Different aspects may be combined, if the logic of the sentence allows for it. Examples: איך פֿלעג געבן אַ שרײַב אָן ikh fleg gebn a shrayb on (I used to suddenly start and complete writing); זײ נעמען זיך צעלאַכן zey nemen zikh tselakhn (they start bursting into laughter).

== Negation ==
The negators are ניט nit and נישט nisht, which are only stressed when the emphasis is required.

Under the scope of negation, indefinite noun phrases, singular or plural, use the negative article קײן keyn instead of the indefinite article אַ a or אַן an. Definite noun phrases under negation use the definite article as usual.

Yiddish allows and often requires double negation: קײנער איז דאָרטן נישט געװען keyner iz dortn nisht geven (literally: 'No one was not there') or איך האָב קײנעם נישט געזען ikh hob keynem nisht gezen (literally: 'I didn't see no one'). In colloquial speech even triple and multiple negations may occasionally be used: איך האָב נישט געװוּסט קײן גאָרנישט נישט ikh hob nisht gevust keyn gornisht nisht (literally: 'I have not known no nothing not').

== Diminutive and emphatic forms ==
Yiddish is rich in various emphatic and emotional forms, including several general diminutive, affectionate and emphatic suffixes may be added to Yiddish nouns and adjectives. Many other emotional suffixes are mainly used for personal names and for particular classes of nouns. Emphatic expression are also formed by reduplication of verbs, composite adjectives, various 'mood' particles and interjections.

Yiddish has two diminutive degrees. The first degree is the regular diminutive. The second degree is a stronger, more affectionate diminutive. The second degree is also known as the iminutive.

In order to form any diminutive, there sometimes needs to be a vowel shift (i-mutation/ i-umlaut).

Yiddish i-mutation
Stem vowel		Word			Meaning
Normal	Umlaut	Base	Diminutive	Iminutive	Meaning
אַ a	ע e	קאַץ katz	קעצל ketzl	קעצעלע ketzele	Cat (kitten)
אָ o	ע e	לאָמפּ lomp	לעמפּל lempl	לעמפּעלע lempele	Lamp
ו u	י i	בוך bukh	ביכל bikhl	ביכעלע bikhele	Book(let)
ױ oy	ײַ ay	הױז hoyz	הײַזל hayzl	הײַזעלע hayzele	House
ױ oy	ײ ey	מױד moyd	מײדל meydl	מײדעלע meydele	Girl

There are certain instances where only the plural can get any diminutive.

קינדער, kinder (children) → קינדערלעך, kinderlekh (children, diminutive).

Besides the addition of -el and -ele, there are more ways to make a word be in the diminutive. One way is by adding the ending טשיק-, or the Polish -czyk.

יונגערמאַן, yungerman (young man) → יונגערמאַנטשיק, yungermanchik.

== Numerals ==
=== Cardinal numbers ===
Number	Yiddish	YIVO	German
0	נול, זעראָ	nul, zero	null
1	אײנס	eyns	eins
2	צװײ	tsvey	zwei
3	דרײַ	dray	drei
4	פֿיר	fir	vier
5	פֿינף	finf	fünf
6	זעקס	zeks	sechs
7	זיבן	zibn	sieben
8	אַכט	akht	acht
9	נײַן	nayn	neun

Number	Yiddish	YIVO	German
10	צען	tsen	zehn
11	עלף, עלעף	elf, elef	elf
12	צװעלף, צװעלעף	tsvelf, tsvelef	zwölf
13	דרײַצן	draytsn	dreizehn
14	פֿערצן	fertsn	vierzehn
15	פֿופֿצן	fuftsen	fünfzehn
16	זעכצן	zekhtsn	sechzehn
17	זיבעצן	zibetsn	siebzehn
18	אַכצן	akhtsn	achtzehn
19	נײַנצן	nayntsn	neunzehn

Number	Yiddish	YIVO	German
20	צװאָנציק, צװאַנציק	tsvontsik, tsvantsik	zwanzig
21	אײן און צװאָנציק	eyn un tsvontsik	einundzwanzig
22	צװײ און צװאָנציק	tsvey un tsvontsik	zweiundzwanzig
30	דרײַסיק	draysik	dreißig
40	פֿערציק	fertsik	vierzig
50	פֿופֿציק	fuftsik	fünfzig
60	זעכציק	zekhtsik	sechzig
70	זיבעציק	zibetsik	siebzig
80	אַכציק	akhtsik	achtzig
90	נײַנציק	nayntsik	neunzig

Number	Yiddish	YIVO	German
12	טוץ	tuts	dutzend
144	גראָס	gros	gros
100	הונדערט	hundert	hundert
200	צװײ הונדערט	tsvey hundert	zweihundert
Tsd.	טױזנט	toyznt	tausend
Mio.	מיליאָן	milyon	Million

=== Ordinal numbers ===
Number	Yiddish	YIVO	German
1st	ערשט	ersht	erst
2nd	צװײט	tsveyt	zweit
3rd	דריט	drit	dritt
4th	פֿערט, פֿערד	fert, ferd	viert
5th	פֿיפֿט	fift	fünft
6th	זעקסט	zekst	sechst
7th	זיבעט	zibet	siebt
8th	אַכט	akht	acht
9th	נײַנט	naynt	neunt
10th	צענט	tsent	zehnt

Number	Yiddish	YIVO	German
11th	עלעפֿט, עלפֿט	eleft, elft	elft
12th	צװעלעפֿט, צװעלפֿט	tsveleft, tsvelft	zwölft
13th	דרײַצנט, דרײַצעט	draytsnt, draytset	dreizehnt
14th	פֿערצנט, פֿערצעט	fertsnt, fertset	vierzehnt
15th	פֿופֿצנט, פֿופֿצעט	fuftsnt, fuftset	fünfzehnt
16th	זעכצנט, זעכצעט	zekhtsnt, zekhtset	sechzehnt
17th	זיבעצנט, זיבעצעט	zibetsnt, zibetset	siebzehnt
18th	אַכטצנט, אַכטצעט	akhtsnt, akhtset	achtzehnt
19th	נײַנצנט, נײַנצעט	nayntsnt, nayntset	neunzehnt
20th	צװאָנציקסט, צװאַנציקסט	tsvotsinkst, tsvantsikst	zwanzigst

Number	Yiddish	YIVO	German
21st	אײן־און־צװאָנסיקסט	eyn un tsvontsikst	einundzwanzigst
30th	דרײַסיקסט	draysikst	dreißigst
40th	פֿערציקסט	fertsikst	vierzigst
50th	פֿופֿציקסט	fuftsikst	fünfzigst
60th	זעכציקסט	zekhtsikst	sechzigst
70th	זיבעציקסט	zibetsikst	siebzigst
80th	אַכציקסט	akhtsikst	achzigst
90th	נײַנציקסט	nayntsikst	neunzigst
100th	הונדערטסט	hundertst	hundertst
1000th	טױזנטסט	toyzntst	tausendst

The ordinals are adjectives, and as such are inflected to agree with the nouns they modify. For example: 'the first lady' is די ערשטע דאַמע (di ershte dame: since דאַמע dame 'lady' is feminine, the ordinal ערשט ersht takes the suffix -e to agree with it.

== Syntax ==
Like most Germanic languages, Yiddish generally follows the V2 word order: the second constituent of any clause is a finite verb, regardless of whether the first constituent is the subject, an adverb, or another topicalized element. The V2 grammar of Yiddish differs from that of German and other closely related languages, however: Yiddish uses V2 word order in subordinate clauses as well as main clauses, while in German only main clauses exhibit V2.

However, verb-initial word order may be used to indicate a causal or other close contextual relationship between consecutive sentences, with a meaning similar to English so.

It is customary to use freer word order in Yiddish poetry.

== Clitics ==
Optional contractions are commonly used in both spoken and literary Yiddish. Some auxiliary verbs and personal pronouns are often contracted, especially in colloquial speech. For example, the phrase ער האָט מיר געזאָגט er hot mir gezogt (he told me) may be contracted to ער׳ט מיר געזאָגט er't mir gezogt or ר׳האָט מיר געזאָגט r'hot mir gezogt with the auxiliary almost disappearing, while זאָלן מיר אים דערצײלן דאָס געהײמע װאָרט zoln mir im dertseyln dos geheyme vort (let's tell him the secret word) may be contracted to זאָל׳מיר׳ן דערצײלן ס׳געהײמע װאָרט zol'mir'n dertseyln s'geheyme vort. The last phrase is more characteristic for the Central (Polish) dialect.

== Dialectal differences ==
The Northern or so-called Lithuanian dialect of Yiddish from the Baltic countries and Belarus is notable, among a number of other peculiarities, for its lack of the neuter gender and the simplified case system. Substantives which are neuter in standard literary Yiddish appear as masculine or feminine. Only two cases, nominative and accusative or oblique, exist in the Northern Yiddish, except for a few isolated remnants of the dative. The auxiliary verb האָבן hobn ('to have') may be used with any verb in the Northern Yiddish, including the cases when the literary Yiddish and other dialects require זײַן zayn ('to be').

Other primary differences between the dialects are in the stressed vowels within the dialect, the differences in their morphology and grammar as well as the northern dialects are more conservative as mentioned above while southern dialects have preserved vowel distinctions.

The realization of stressed vowels is where the main phonetic distinctions across the different dialects are found. Long and short vowels are not separated in Yiddish. Stressed vowels are about the same length. Compared to their English equivalents, they are located closer to the peripheral locations of the cardinal vowels in the vocal tract.

== Contemporary Hasidic Yiddish ==
Spoken Yiddish within contemporary Hasidic communities has seen the emergence of a new set of demonstrative determiners, de, deys, and deye. Deye (determiner) and deys (pronoun) are both used in the singular. They roughly correspond to the English word ‘This’. For example, one may hear deye yingl iz groys 'This boy is big', but for the pronoun form it would be Deys iz groys 'This is big'. Deys, like dos (from which it is likely derived, and blended with di) when functioning as a pronoun, is used only for non-human subject nouns. Finally, deye 'these' is used for plural and can also function as a pronoun. Curiously, dey, deys, and deye do not appear in Hasidic Yiddish in written form, reflecting the wide divergence between spoken and written forms among Hasidic Yiddish speakers.

A common belief, especially among non-native or academically trained Yiddish speakers, is that the case and gender system is disappearing from Hasidism|Hasidic Yiddish, though this has been found to be a misapprehension.

In casual usage of Hasidic Yiddish, especially in spoken form, the definite articles der, di, and dos often appear to have shifted to a more general single definite article de in the nominative, accusative, and dative cases, for both singular and plural, mirroring English the, complemented by the demonstrative determiners de, deys, and deye.

However, more recent studies of Hasidic Yiddish publications show that a definite case and gender system exists in written Hasidic Yiddish, albeit in a modified, and in some cases, more relaxed, form. Der is widely used for masculine nouns, but never for feminine, even as the use of di has crept beyond the feminine and the plural. In the accusative and dative cases, Hasidic Yiddish uses the definite article dem and its corresponding inflected nouns for the masculine case, and, to a lesser degree, to the dative feminine, where applicable. However, the usage of der for the accusative feminine is more relaxed, and is often replaced by di.

On the whole, written Hasidic Yiddish appears largely dependent on an individual writer's knowledge of Yiddish grammar and specific editorial style guides. More established publications, such as Der Yid, Di Tzeitung, and Maales adhere to the case and gender system more closely (as, in the case of the first two, is reflected in their publication names). The same is true for much of what published in Israel, such as the works of the popular children's book author Menachem Mendel. Dos Yiddishe Vort, published for many decades by Agudath Israel of America until 2013 and whose many issues are still widely read in Hasidic communities, adhered meticulously to the usual standards, as did the Jerusalem-based Dos Yiddishe Licht, and its present incarnation, Balaychtungen. Maales, in particular, has since its inception in the 1990s placed strong emphasis on standards and consistency for both grammar and orthography.

Newer Hasidic Yiddish publications show greater variance among their writers, some of whom show adherence to standard Yiddish orthographic styles and conventions, while others do not, suggesting that editorial guidelines focus largely on content and article structure, and don't have strong style preferences. This is seen not only for case and gender, but also on matters of spelling, punctuation, and the use and styling of English words in transliteration.

A more accurate observation is that Hasidic communities show less concern for grammatical rules – neither for Yiddish nor for the widely used scholastic Hebrew (nor, for that matter, for English). This could be due to a vestigial aversion to the study of grammar, or dikduk, within ordinary educational curricula, originally a reaction to the 19th century Haskalah, or Jewish Enlightenment, which sought to increase grammatical knowledge and standards for both Yiddish and Hebrew. Another possible cause for grammatical standards that differ somewhat from conventional academic Yiddish is the tendency among Hasidim towards autodidactism in adulthood, as the educational emphasis for children and adolescents is largely on religious studies, especially for boys, who tend to be more Yiddish-speaking than girls. Despite these, however, Hasidic Yiddish is nonetheless still highly standardized, suggesting that standards are learned as first principles directly from the language as it is used, and simply lack deference to standards-creating institutions who have ignored more nuanced linguistic developments in post-World War II Yiddish-speaking communities.

== Bibliography ==
- Jacobs, Neil G. Yiddish: a Linguistic Introduction, Cambridge University Press, Cambridge, 2005, ISBN 0-521-77215-X.
- Katz, Dovid, Grammar of the Yiddish Language, Duckworth, London, 1987, ISBN 0-7156-2161-0.
  - https://www.dovidkatz.net/dovid/PDFLinguistics/2-1987-Grammar-Yiddish.pdf Grammar of the Yiddish Language by Dovid Katz
- Mark, Yudl, A Grammar of Standard Yiddish, CYCO, New York, 1978 (in Yiddish).
- Schaechter, Mordkhe, Yiddish Two, League for Yiddish, Inc., New York, 1993.
- Weinreich, Uriel. 1971. College Yiddish. New York: YIVO Institute for Jewish Research.
- Zucker, S. 1994–2003. Yiddish: An Introduction to the Language, Literature and Culture 1–2. New York: Workmen's Circle.
