= Marty (given name) =

Marty is mainly a masculine given name, often a short form (hypocorism) of Martin. Notable people and fictional characters with the name include:

== People ==
- Marty Barrett (disambiguation), multiple people
- Marty Bergen (baseball) (1871–1900), American baseball player
- Marty Booker (born 1976), National Football League player
- Marty Brennaman (born 1942), American sportscaster
- Marty Casey (born 1973), lead singer, songwriter and second guitarist of the band Lovehammers
- Marty Cordova (born 1969), American former Major League Baseball player
- Marty Ehrlich (born 1955), American jazz musician
- Marty Feldman (1934–1982), English writer, comedian and actor
- Marty Friedman (basketball) (1889–1986), American Hall-of-Fame professional basketball player and coach
- Marty Friedman (born 1962), American guitarist
- Marty Glickman (1917–2001), American Olympic sprinter, All-American football player and sports announcer
- Marty Hurney (born 1955), American football executive
- Marty Jannetty (born 1962), American professional wrestler
- Marty Kinerk (1940–2012), American racing driver
- Marty Krofft (born 1937), television producer
- Marty Liquori (born 1949), American middle distance runner
- Marty Markowitz (born 1945), American politician, former New York State Senator and Borough President of Brooklyn
- Marty McSorley (born 1963), Canadian retired National Hockey League player
- Marty Meehan (born 1956), American attorney, politician and law professor, President of the University of Massachusetts
- Marty Natalegawa (born 1963), Indonesian diplomat and politician
- Marty Mornhinweg (born 1962), National Football League quarterback coach and former head coach
- Marty Nothstein (born 1971), American professional cyclist
- Marty Peretz (born 1938), American publisher
- Marty Puccio (born 1973), American murderer
- Marty Reisman (1930–2012), American table tennis champion
- Marty Riessen (born 1941), American tennis player
- Marty Ross (musician), (born 1959), American musician
- Marty Ryan, American politician
- Marty Schottenheimer (1943–2021), American former National Football League head coach
- Marty Seifert (born 1972), American politician, former Republican Minority Leader of the Minnesota House of Representatives
- Marty Stuart (born 1958), American country music singer
- Martin Scorsese (born 1942), American filmmaker; affectionately known as Marty
- Marty Turco (born 1975), Canadian National Hockey League goaltender
- Marty Walsh (born 1967), American politician and trade unionist
- Marty Wendell (1926–2012), American football player

== Stage name ==
- Marty Allen, born Morton David Alpern (1922–2018), American stand-up comedian and actor
- Marty Balin, born Martyn Jerel Buchwald (1942–2018), American rock singer, musician and co-founder of the band Jefferson Airplane
- Marty Grebb, born Martin Grebb (1945–2020), American musician, member of The Buckinghams
- Marty Robbins, born Martin David Robinson (1925–1982), American country music singer, songwriter and musician
- Marty Wilde, born Reginald Leonard Smith in 1939, English singer and songwriter
- Marty (rapper), born Martin Lorenzo Santiago in 1987, American Christian hip-hop musician

== Fictional characters ==
- Marty Duko, a detective in the television series Orphan Black
- Marty Glouberman, a recurring character in the Netflix adult animated series Big Mouth
- Marty Maraschino, a member of the Pink Ladies in the musical Grease and in the movie Grease
- Marty Mauser, the main character of the film Marty Supreme
- Marty McFly, the main character of the Back to the Future film trilogy
- Marty Murray (Brookside), on the British soap opera Brookside
- Marty Saybrooke, on the American soap opera One Life to Live
- Marty Stieber, in the SSX snowboarding video game series
- Marty Taylor, Tim Taylor's younger brother from the American television sitcom Home Improvement
- Marty Wolf, a filmmaker and the main antagonist of Big Fat Liar
- Marty the Zebra, in the Madagascar series of animated films
- Marty, nicknamed Marty from the Party, a recurring character and Buffy's love interest in Disney Channel series Andi Mack
- Marty, the main protagonist of the animated series Eon Kid
- Marty, in the American television sitcom Gimme a Break
