= List of diminutives by language =

The following is a list of diminutives by language.

== Indo-European languages ==
=== Germanic languages ===
==== English ====
English has a great variety of historical diminutives adopted from other languages but many of these are lexicalized. Productive diminutives are infrequent to nonexistent in Standard English in comparison with many other languages.

===== Native English endings that could be seen as diminutives =====
- -k/-ock/-uck: bollock, bullock, buttock, fetlock, hillock, mattock (OE mattuc), mullock, pillock, stalk, whelk, yolk
- -n/-en/-on (accusative or feminine): chicken, kitten, maiden
- -le (frequentative -l): puddle, sparkle
- -s: Becks, Betts, Wills
- -sie/-sies/-sy (babytalk assimilative or from patrici- of Patsy): bitsy, footsie (1930), halfsies, onesies, popsy (1860), teensy-weensy, tootsie (1854), twosies, Betsy, Patsy, Robsy
- -o (American nicknaming, later Commonwealth): bucko, daddio, garbo, kiddo, smoko, wacko, Jacko, Ricko,
- -er/-ers/-ster (diminutive, hypocoristic, also elided rhotic -a): bonkers (1948), preggers (1940), starkers (1905), Becker[s], Lizzers, Hankster, Patster
- -a (Geordie assimilative -er): Gazza, Macca
- -z (Geordie -s): Bez, Chaz, Gaz
- -y (assimilative -y): buddy, doggy, horsey

===== Loanwords and native English words using foreign-language diminutives =====
- -ling (Norse diminutive-patrinominative): darling, duckling, fingerling, gosling, underling
- -erel/-rel (Franco-Latin comparative, pejorative -(t)eriale): cockerel (1450s), coistrel (1570s), doggerel (1249), dotterel (15th century), gangrel (14th century), hoggerel, kestrel (15th century), mackerel (c. 1300), minstrel (1180), mongrel (1540s), pickerel (1388), puckerel, scoundrel (1589), suckerel, taistrel (18th century, N for E tearstrel: tear+-ster+-rel), tumbrel (1223), titterel/whimbrel (1520s), wastrel (1847)
- -el/-il/-ille/-l/-le (Norman-Francish lenite -c-/-g- or metathetic -i- dim. -iol-): broil (14th century; F brusle), broil (15th century; VL brodicula), griddle (c. 1300, ME gridel, F gredil, VL graticula; cognate with E hurdle), grille (1661), jail (1250s; F jaiole, nF gaiole, VL gabiola, L caveola), mail (1320; L macula), pill (1400), quail (c. 1300; ML quaccula), rail (1320; L regula), rail (1460; VL rasculum), rail (1450s; VL ragula), roll (c. 1300), squirrel (1327), toil (c. 1300; VL tudicula), trail (c. 1300; VL tragula)
- -et/-ette/-etti/-etto/-it/-ita/-ito/-itta (F-S-I-L diminutive -itat-): amaretto, burrito, cigarette, clarinet, courgette, diskette, fajita, falsetto, faucet (c. 1400), gambit (1656), kitchenette, marionette, minuet, oubliette, palette, pallet (1350s), parquet, poppet (c. 1300), puppet (16th century), rabbit (1380), Sagitta, señorita, spaghetti, suffragette, swallet (c. 1660), taquito, towelette, wallet (1350s)
- -ot/-otte (F ablaut or assimilative dim. -ultat-): culottes, harlot (13th century), Charlotte, Diderot, Lancelot (1180), Margot, Peugeot, Pierrot
- -let/-lette (F dim.): aglet (15th century), applet (1995), booklet (1859), chicklet (1886), wikt:eyelet (1400), gauntlet, goblet, hamlet (15th century), leaflet (1787), oillet (1350s), omelette (1611), piglet (1883), roulette (1734), tablet (c. 1300)
- -ey/-ie/-y (Scottish-Dutch dim., 15th century-on): cookie (1703), daddy (c. 1500), dearie, doggy (1820), girlie (1942), kitty (16th century), laddie (1546), mammy (1520), mommy (1902), mummy (1820), sissy (1846), whitey (1820), Debbie, Frankie, Frenchy (1820), Johnny (1670), Marty, Morty, Nancy
- -kin (Dutch dim.-acc. -ken/-chen, 15th century-on): bodkin, cannikin, catkin, lambkin, manikin, napkin, pannikin, ramekin, welkin (OE wolcen)
- -kins (hypocoristic dim.-degen.): Laurakins, Sallykins
- -leus/-ola/-ole/-oli/-ola/-olo/-olus/-ula/-ule/-uleus/-ulum (Francish-Spanish-Italian-Latin dim., mainly 17th century-on): alveolus, areola, areole, article, cannoli, casserole, cerulean, cuniculus, curriculum, Equuleus, ferrule, formula, granule, homunculus, insula, malleolus, majuscule, minuscule, nodule, nucleus, nucleolus, particle, pergola, pendulum, pianola, piccolo, ravioli, raviolo, reticle, reticule, reticulum, spatula, tarantula, vacuole, vinculum
- -eau/-el/-ella/-elle/-ello/-il/-illa/-ille/-illo/-le (F-S-I-L bidim.; E -kin): armadillo, bordello, bureau, castle (OE castel, <1000), codicil, espadrille, flotilla, limoncello, mantle, Monticello, morsel, organelle, pastel, pencil, pestle, quadrille, quarrel, rowel (1344), scintilla, vanilla, violoncello
- -ina/-ine/-ini/-ino (F-S-I simulative, mainly 1750s-on; E -like or -ling as adj. but cognate with -ing as n. or adj.): bambino, coquina, doctrine (1350s), domino, farina, figurine, linguine, maraschino, marina, neutrino, palomino, tambourine, zucchini
- mini-/micro- (commercial miniature compound): minibar, miniblind, miniboss, minibus, minicar (1949), minicassette (1967), minicomputer (1963), minigame, minigun, minimall, minimarket (1965), minimart, mini-nuke, minischool, miniseries (1974), miniskirt (1965), minitower, minivan, miniver (1250), mini-LP, mini-me, MiniDisc, microkitchen, microcosm

==== Scots ====
In Lowland Scots diminutives are frequently used. The most common diminutive suffixes are -ie, -ock, -ockie (double diminutive) or the Caithness -ag (the latter from Scottish Gaelic, and perhaps reinforcing the other two before it). -ie is by far the most common suffix used. Others are -le or -er for frequentative or diminutive emphasis. Less frequent diminutives are -kin (often after the diminutive -ie) and -lin.

Examples include

- -ie: burnie (small burn), feardie or feartie (frightened person, coward), gamie (gamekeeper), kiltie (kilted soldier), mannie (man), Nessie (Loch Ness Monster), postie (postman), wifie (woman)
- -ock: bittock (wee bit, little bit), playock (toy), sourock (sorrel),
- -ag: Cheordag (Geordie), bairnag (small child)
- -ockie: hooseockie (little house), wifockie (little woman)
- -le: crummle (a bread-crumb), snirtle (snigger, snort)
- -er: plowter (dabble), stoiter (stumble)
- -kin: cuitikins (spatterdashes), flindrikin (light, flimsy), joskin (yokel)
- -lin: hauflin (half-grown boy), gorblin (unfledged bird)

==== Dutch ====
In Dutch, diminutives are used extensively. Their meaning often goes beyond a reduction in size and they are not merely restricted to nouns. The nuances of meaning expressed by diminutives are particularly unique to Dutch and can be difficult to master for non-native speakers. Diminutives are very productive endings, they can change the function of a word and are formed by adding one of the suffixes -je, -pje, -kje, -tje, -etje to the word in question, depending on the latter's phonology:

- -je for words ending in -b, -c, -d, -t, -f, -g, -ch, -k, -p, -v, -x, -z or -s: neef → neefje (male cousin, nephew), lach → lachje (laugh), schaap → schaapje (sheep)
- -pje for words ending in -m: boom (tree) → boompje (but bloemetje if the meaning is bouquet of flowers; see below)
- -kje for words ending in -ing: koning (king) → koninkje (the 'ng'-sound transforms into 'nk'), but vondeling → vondelingetje (foundling)
- -tje for words ending in -h, -j, -l, -n, -r, -w, or a vowel other than -y: zoen → zoentje (kiss), boei → boeitje (buoy), appel → appeltje (apple), ei → eitje (egg), keu → keutje (billiard cue). In case of a single open vowel, when adding "-tje" would change the pronunciation, this vowel is doubled: auto → autootje (car), café → cafeetje (pub) (note the accent is lost because the 'ee' preserves the right pronunciation). The word jongen (boy) has an irregular diminutive, losing its ending -en: jongen → jongetje
- -′tje for words ending in -y and for abbreviations: baby → baby'tje, cd → cd'tje, A4 → A4'tje
- -etje for words ending in -b, -l, -m, -n, -ng or -r preceded by a "short" (lax) vowel: bal → balletje (ball), kam → kammetje (comb), ding → dingetje (thing), kar → karretje (cart). Note that except for the ending -ng the final consonant is doubled to preserve the vowel's shortness.

A few words have several diminutives: kip → kippetje or kipje (chicken), rib → ribbetje or ribje (rib). One word has even three possible diminutives: rad → radje, raadje or radertje (cog). A few words have more than one diminutive, of which one is formed by lengthening of the vowel sound with a different meaning. Examples: gat-gaatje/gatje, glas-glaasje/glasje, lot-lootje/lotje, pad-paadje/padje

Suffix	IPA	Final letter	Remarks	Example	Translation	Diminutive
-je	t	d / t		bad	bath	badje
-je	f	f		straf	punishment	strafje
-je	ɣ / χ	g / ch		dag	day	dagje
-je	k	k		dak	roof	dakje
-je	p	p		schaap	sheep	schaapje
-je	s	s		kaas	cheese	kaasje
-je	ks	x		fax	fax	faxje
-tje	aː	a	This is an open vocal	vla	custard	vlaatje
-tje	eː	e	This is an open vocal	zee	sea	zeetje
-tje	i / iː	ie / y	This is an open vocal	knie	knee	knietje
-tje	oː	o / eau	This is an open vocal	bureau	desk	bureautje
-tje	y	u	This is an open vocal	menu	menu	menuutje
-tje	l	l	When preceded by a doubled open vowel	paal	pole	paaltje
-tje	n	n	When preceded by a doubled open vowel	baan	job	baantje
-tje	r / ɾ / ʁ	r	When preceded by a doubled open vowel	haar	hair	haartje
-etje	l	l	When preceded by a closed vowel	bal	ball	balletje
-etje	m	m	When preceded by a closed vowel	dam	dam	dammetje
-etje	n	n	When preceded by a closed vowel	kan	jug	kannetje
-etje	r / ɾ / ʁ	r	When preceded by a closed vowel	kar	car	karretje
-etje	ŋ	ng	When preceded by a closed vowel	slang	snake	slangetje
-pje	m	m	When preceded by a closed vowel	boom	tree	boompje
-pje	m	m	When preceded by a closed vowel	raam	window	raampje
-pje	m	m	When preceded by a closed vowel	zeem	chammy	zeempje
-kje	ɪŋ	ing	When a noun contains more than one syllable and the stress is on the syllable before the -ing ending, the diminutive suffix will be -kje. The ng will be replaced by the cluster -nkje.	woning	home	woninkje
-kje	ɪŋ	ing	When a noun contains more than one syllable and the stress is on the syllable before the -ing ending, the diminutive suffix will be -kje. The ng will be replaced by the cluster -nkje.	mening	opinion	meninkje
-kje	ɪŋ	ing	When a noun contains more than one syllable and the stress is on the syllable before the -ing ending, the diminutive suffix will be -kje. The ng will be replaced by the cluster -nkje.	pudding	pudding	puddinkje
-kje	ɪŋ	ing	When a noun contains more than one syllable and the stress is on the syllable before the -ing ending, the diminutive suffix will be -kje. The ng will be replaced by the cluster -nkje.	haring	herring	harinkje

The diminutive suffixes -ke(n) (from which the Western Dutch and later Standard Dutch form -tje has derived by palatalization), -eke(n), -ske(n), -ie, -kie, and -pie are (still) regularly used in different dialects instead of the former mentioned. Some of these form part of expressions that became standard language:

- Slapie: a buddy who one shares sleeping quarters with
- Jonkie: a young one
- Koppiekoppie: smart thinking
- Koek en zopie: small food and drinks stall for ice skaters that springs up along frozen canals during winter
- Makkie: easy job, piece of cake (From gemak = ease.)
- Manneke(n): little man, little fellow (from which the word mannequin was derived)
- Bakkie: cup (of coffee), rig (radio transmitter), trailer

The form -ke(n) is nowadays still present in many women's names: Janneke (< Jan < Johannes, Dutch equivalent of John); Renske (< Rens, men's name); Marieke, Marijke, Mieke, Meike (all from Maria); Anneke (< Anna, Anne); Tineke (< Martine); Joke, Hanneke (< Johanna); and many others like Lieneke (<< Catharina, compare Caitlin), Lonneke, Wieteke, Dineke, Nelleke, etc. Similar women's names, such as Femke and Sjouke, exist in Frisian. Until the early twentieth century the diminutive was a normal way (in the Netherlands, not in Belgium) of forming men's names into women's names: Dirk → Dirkje, Pieter → Pietertje.

In Dutch, the diminutive is not merely restricted to nouns, but the diminutive form is a noun in some cases. Note that adverbs get an extra s appended to the diminutive:

- adjectives: groen (green) → groentje (lit. "little green" meaning rookie) adjective → noun;
- adverbs: even (just) → eventjes ("just a minute"); net (neat) → netjes (properly); zacht (soft) → zachtjes (gently, slowly)
- numerals: een-tweetje (numeral one-two → with diminutive one-two pass) numeral → noun; wij drietjes (numeral three → with diminutive the three of us); vijfje, tientje, twintigje etc. → numeral five, ten, twenty etc. → with diminutive a coin or bank note with a value of five, ten, twenty etc.. → noun
- personal pronouns: onderonsje (pronoun us → with diminutive tête-à-tête)
- prepositions: ommetje (preposition around → with diminutive around the block) preposition → noun; uitje (preposition out → with diminutive field trip, picnic) preposition → noun
- verbs: moetje (verb must, to need → with diminutive shotgun marriage) verb (or anything someone needs to do against that persons wish → noun

Some nouns have two different diminutives, each with a different meaning:

- bloem (flower) → bloempje (lit. "small flower") This is the regularly formed diminutive.
- bloem (flower) → bloemetje (lit. also "small flower", but meaning bouquet).
- pop (doll) → popje (lit. "small doll", but it is also a term of endearment).
- pop (doll) → poppetje (lit. also "small doll" but it means also "human figure" or a "fragile girl").

A few words exist solely in a diminutive form, e.g. zeepaardje (seahorse) and sneeuwklokje (Snowdrop), while others, e.g. meisje (girl), originally a diminutive of meid (maid), have acquired a meaning independent of their non-diminutive forms. See other examples.

A diminutive can also sometimes be added to an uncountable noun to refer to a single portion: ijs (ice, ice cream) → ijsje (ice cream treat, cone of ice cream), bier (beer) → biertje, cola → colaatje.

When used, the diminutive has mostly a neutral or positive connotation:

- Na een uurtje gekletst te hebben met haar vriend ging het meisje naar huis.

After chatting with her boyfriend for a "little" hour, the girl went home.

The diminutive can, however, also be used pejoratively.

- Hij was vanavond weer echt het "'mannetje'".

"He acted as if he was the "little" man of the evening."

Besides the above, Dutch also has the now no longer productive diminutive -lijn (similar to the German diminutive -lein), which is preserved in several words like for example vendelijn "small flag", Duimelijn "Little Thumbling", vogelijn "little bird" and lievelijn "sweetie".

The grammatical gender of words in the diminutive is always neuter, regardless of the original gender of the words.

==== Afrikaans ====
In Afrikaans, the diminutive is formed by adding one of the suffixes -ie., -pie, -kie, -'tjie, -tjie, -jie, -etjie to the word, depending on the latter's phonology (some exceptions exist to these rules):

- -ie for words ending in -f, -g, -k, -p or -s: neef → nefie (male cousin), lag → laggie (laugh), skaap → skapie (sheep)
- -pie for words ending in -m: boom (tree) → boompie (little tree)
- -kie for words ending in -ing: koning (king) → koninkie (little king)
- -′tjie for words ending in -i, -o, or -u (usually borrowed from other languages): impi → impi′tjie
- -jie for words ending in -d or -t: hoed (hat) → hoedjie (little hat)
- -etjie for CVC words ending in -b, -l, -m, -n or -r, and requires the last consonant to be doubled if it follows a short vowel: rob (seal) → robbetjie, bal (ball) → balletjie, kam (comb) → kammetjie, kar (car) → karretjie
- -tjie for other words ending in -l, -n, -r or a vowel: soen → soentjie (kiss), koei (cow) → koeitjie, appel (apple) → appeltjie, beker (cup) → bekertjie, baba (baby) → babatjie

Diminutives of words that are themselves diminutives are used, for example baadjie (jacket) → baadjietjie (little jacket). Such constructions do not appear in Dutch.

Afrikaans has almost identical usage and grammar for diminutive words as Dutch, the language Afrikaans was derived from (detailed above). There are differences in Dutch as compared to Afrikaans. One is that suffixes end with -je (e.g. beetje, a [little] bit, mandje, basket) as compared, i.e. in Afrikaans (e.g. bietjie, mandjie—same meanings respectively). This reflects the usage, i.e. in the dialects of the province of Holland that most of Dutch settlers came from. Another difference is that in the Dutch language also adjectives and adverbs can be conjugated as diminutives as if they were nouns. Diminutives are widely used in both languages, but possibly more so in the Afrikaans language.

In some cases the diminutive in Afrikaans is the most commonly used, or even only form of the word: bietjie (few/little), mandjie (basket), baadjie (jacket) and boontjie (bean). In other cases the diminutive may be used figuratively rather than literally to imply affection, camaraderie, euphemism, sarcasm, or disdain, depending on context.

==== (High) German ====
German features words such as "Häuschen" for "small house", "Würstchen" for "small sausage" and "Hündchen" for "small dog". Diminutives are more frequently used than in English. Some words only exist in the diminutive form, e.g. "Kaninchen" ("rabbit") derived from Old French word conin, which in turn is from the Latin diminutive cuniculus. The use of diminutives is quite different between the dialects. The Alemannic dialects for example use the diminutive very often.

There are two suffixes that can be systematically applied in German:

- -chen, e.g. "Brötchen" for bread roll ("little bread"; corresponding with English -kin as seen in "napkin", Low German (Low Saxon) -je, -tje, -ke, -ken and other forms depending on the dialect area)
- -lein e.g. "Männlein" for little man (corresponding with English -let and -ling, Alemannic/Swabian/Swiss -lé (Spätzlé), -li (Hörnli), Bavarian and Austrian -l, and Latin -culus/-cula).

The contemporary colloquial diminutives -chen and -lein are always neuter in their grammatical gender, regardless of the original word. For example, the common German word for girl is das Mädchen, which is neuter because it is a diminutive of die Magd (feminine) – the maiden (Handmaid, maidservant, not: virgin). While Mädchen is an everyday word, Magd is not common in modern use—and in any meaning other than "female farm employee" it is associated with medieval language (as in fables, novels, etc.). However, -ling has a masculine gender. In the cases of "Zögling", "Setzling", this form nominalizes a verb, as in, "ziehen" - "Zögling", "setzen" - "Setzling". Use of these diminutive suffixes on a finally stressed word stem causes umlaut of the stressed vowel.

===== Austro-Bavarian =====
In Austro-Bavarian, the -l or -erl suffix can replace almost any usual German diminutive. For example, the standard word for 'girl' in German is Mädchen and, while Mädchen is still used frequently in Austrian German, a more colloquial "cute" usage would be Mädl, Madl or Mäderl. It is regular for Austrians to replace the normal Bisschen ('a little' as in "Can I have a little more?") with Bissel. This has become a very distinctive feature of Austrian German. Contrary to the previous section, umlaut are not used that frequently (Gurke - Gürkchen vs. Gurkerl).

A familiar example of the -erl diminutive is Nannerl, the childhood name of Maria Anna Mozart, the sister of the celebrated composer. Historically, some common Austro-Bavarian surnames were also derived from (clipped) first names using the -l suffix; for example, (Jo)hann > Händl, Man(fred) > Mändl (both with epenthetic d and umlaut), (Gott)fried > Friedl, and so on.

===== Swabian =====
In Swabian German this is done by adding a -le suffix (the e being distinctly pronounced, but not stressed). For example, a small house would be a "Häusle" or a little girl a "Mädle". A unique feature of Swabian is that words other than nouns may be suffixed with -le, which is not the case with other German dialects (except Bernese Swiss German), High German, or other languages: wasele (diminutive of was, what) or jetzetle (diminutive of jetzt, now) or kommele (diminutive of kommen, come). (In both Spanish and Italian, these may be formed similarly, e.g. igualito – diminutive of igual, same and pochino or pochettino - diminutive of poco, a little/a few). Many variants of Swabian also have a plural diminutive suffix: -la. E.g.: "oi Mädle, zwoi Mädla."

===== High Alemannic =====
In High Alemannic the standard suffix -li is added to the root word. A little would be äs bitzli (literally a little bite) as to "ein bisschen" in Standard German. The diminutive form of bitzli is birebitzli.

Vowels of proper names often turn into an umlaut in Highest Alemannic, whereas in High Alemannic it remains the same. Proper names: Christian becomes Chrigi, in Highest Alemannic: Chrigu. Sebastien becomes Sebi resp. Sebu. Sabrina becomes Sabsi resp. Sabä. Corinne becomes Cogi resp. Corä. Barbara becomes Babsi resp. Babsä, Robert becomes Röbi resp. Röbu. Jakob becomes Köbi resp. Köbu. Gabriel becomes Gäbu in Highest Alemannic.

==== Low German ====
In varieties of West Low German, spoken in the east of the Netherlands, diminutives occasionally use the umlaut in combination with the suffixes -gie(n):

- man → mānnegie (EN: man → little man)
- kom → kōmmegie (EN: bowl → little bowl)

In East Frisian Low Saxon, -je, -tje, and -pje are used as a diminutive suffix (e.g. huis becomes huisje (little house); boom becomes boompje (little tree)). Compare this with the High German suffix -chen (see above). Some words have a slightly different suffix, even though the diminutive always ends with -je. For example, man becomes mannetje (little man). All these suffixes East Frisian Low Saxon shares with Dutch.

In Northern Low Saxon, the -je diminutive is rarely used, except maybe Gronings, such as in Buscherumpje, a fisherman's shirt. It is usually substituted with lütte, meaning "little", as in dat lütte Huus- the small house. The same goes for the North Germanic languages.

Historically, some common Low German surnames were derived from (clipped) first names using the -ke(n) suffix; for example, Ludwig > Lüdeke, Wilhelm > Wilke(n), Wernher > Werneke, and so on. Some of these name bases are difficult to recognize in comparison to standard German; for example, Dumke, Domke < Döm 'Thomas', Klitzke < Klitz 'Clement', etc. Some of these names may also have Slavic or mixed Slavic-Germanic origins.

==== Yiddish ====
Yiddish frequently uses diminutives. In Yiddish the primary diminutive is -l or -ele in singular, and -lekh or -elekh in plural, sometimes involving a vowel trade in the root. Thus Volf becomes Velvl, Khaim: Khaiml, mame (mother): mamele, Khane: Khanele, Moyshe: Moyshele, kind (child): kindl or kindele, Bobe (grandmother): Bobele, teyl (piece): teylekhl (mote), regn (rain): regndl, hant (hand): hentl, fus (foot): fisl. The longer version of the suffix (-ele instead of -l) sounds generally more affectionate and usually used with proper names. Sometimes a few variations of the plural diminutive forms are possible: balebos (owner, boss): balebeslekh (newly-wed young men): balebatimlekh (petty bourgeois men).

Many other diminutives of Slavic origin are commonly used, mostly with proper names:

- -ke: Khaim/Khaimke, Mordkhe/Motke, Sore/Sorke, Khaye/Khayke, Avrom/Avromke, bruder/bruderke (brother). These forms are usually considered nicknames and are only used with very close friends and relatives.
- -[e]nyu: kale/kalenyu (dear bride), harts/hartsenyu (sweetheart), zeyde/zeydenyu (dear grandpa). Often used as an affectionate quasi-vocative.
- -tshik: Avrom/Avromtshik, yungerman/yungermantshik (young man).
- -inke: tate/tatinke (dear daddy), baleboste/balebostinke (dear hostess).
- -ik: Shmuel/Shmulik, Yisroel/Srolik.
- -tse or -tshe: Sore/Sortshe, Avrom/Avromtshe, Itsik/Itshe.
- -(e)shi: bobe/bobeshi (dear grandma), zun/zuneshi (dear son), tate/tateshi (dear daddy).
- -lebn: tate-lebn, Malke-lebn. This particle might be considered a distinct compound word, and not a suffix.

These suffixes can also be combined: Khaim/Khaimkele, Avrom/Avromtshikl, Itsik/Itshenyu.

Some Yiddish proper names have common non-trivial diminutive forms, somewhat similar to English names such as Bob or Wendy: Akive/Kive, Yishaye/Shaye, Rivke/Rivele.

Yiddish also has diminutive forms of adjectives (all the following examples are given in masculine single form):

- -lekh (-like): roytlekher (reddish), gelblekher (yellowish), zislekher (sweetish).
- -ink (-ling): roytinker (cute red), gelinker (cute yellow), zisinker (so-sweet).
- -tshik or -itshk: kleynitshker (teeny-tiney), altitshker (dear old).

Some Yiddish diminutives have been incorporated into modern Israeli Hebrew: Imma (mother) to Immaleh and Abba (father) to Abbaleh.

==== Icelandic ====
A common diminutive suffix in Icelandic is -lingur:

Examples:

- grís (pig) → gríslingur (piglet)
- bók (book) → bæklingur (pamphlet/booklet)
- jeppi (jeep) → jepplingur (SUV)

==== Swedish ====
The Swedish use of diminutive is heavily dominated by prefixes such as "mini-", "lill-", "små-" and "pytte-" and all of these prefixes can be put in front of almost all nouns, adjectives, adverbs and verbs:

småsur (a bit angry)
pytteliten (tiny)
lillgammal (small-old, about young people who act as adults)
minilektion (short lession)
småjogga (jog nonchalantly or slowly)
minigitarr (small guitar)

The suffixes "-ling" and "-ing" are also used to some extent:

and (duck) -> älling (duckling)
kid (fawn) -> killing (goat kid)
gås (goose) -> gässling (gosling)
myndig (of age) -> myndling (person that is not of age, i.e. under 18)
halv (half) + växa (grow) -> halvväxing (semi-grown up boy)

The suffix "-is" can be used as a diminutive suffix to some extent but is often used as a slang suffix which is very colloquial.

=== Latin and Romance languages ===
==== Latin ====
See latin diminutive.

In the Latin language the diminutive is formed also by suffixes of each gender affixed to the word stem. Each variant ending matches with a blend of the variant secondary demonstrative pronouns: In Old Latin, ollus, olla, ollum; later ille, illa, illud (< illum-da to set off ileum).

- -ulus, -ula, -ulum, e.g. globulus (globule) from globus (globe).
- -culus, -cula, -culum, e.g. homunculus (so-small man) from homo (man)
- -olus, -ola, -olum, e.g. malleolus (small hammer) from malleus (hammer)
- -ellus, -ella, -ellum, e.g. libellus (little book) smaller than librulus (small book) from liber (book)
- -ittus, -itta, -ittum (hypocoristic, a doublet of -itus)

Similarly, the diminutive of gladius (sword) is gladiolus, a plant whose leaves look like small swords.

Adjectives as well as nouns can be diminished, including paululus (very small) from paulus (small).

The diminutive ending for verbs is -ill-, placed after the stem and before the endings. The diminutive verb changes to the first conjugation, no matter what the original conjugation. Conscribere "write onto" is third-conjugation, but the diminutive conscribillare "scribble over" is first-conjugation.

The Anglicisation of Latin diminutives is relatively common, especially in medical terminology. In nouns, the most common conversion is removal of the -us, -a, -um endings and trading them for a mum e. Hence some examples are vacuole from vacuolum, particle from particula, and globule from globulus.

==== French ====
French diminutives can be formed with a wide range of endings. Often, a consonant or phoneme is placed between the root word and the diminutive ending for phonetic purposes: porcelet < pourceau, from lat. porcellus.

Feminine nouns or names are typically made diminutive by adding the ending -ette: fillette (little girl or little daughter [affectionate], from fille, girl or daughter); courgette (small squash or marrow, i.e., zucchini, from courge, squash); Jeannette (from Jeanne); pommettes (cheekbones), from pomme (apple); cannette (female duckling), from cane (female duck). This ending has crossed over into English as well (e.g. kitchenette, Corvette, farmette). Feminine nouns may also end in -elle (mademoiselle, from madame).

Masculine names or nouns may be turned into diminutives with the ending -ot, -on, or -ou (MF -eau), but sometimes, for phonetic reasons, an additional consonant is added (e.g. -on becomes -ton, -ou becomes -nou, etc.): Jeannot (Jonny), from Jean (John); Pierrot (Petey) from Pierre (Peter); chiot (puppy), from chien (dog); fiston (sonny or sonny-boy), from fils (son); caneton (he-duckling), from canard (duck or he-duck); chaton (kitten), from chat (cat); minou (kitty, presumably from the root for miauler, to meow); Didou (Didier); Philou or Filou (Philippe).

Some masculine diminutives are formed with the masculine version of -ette: -et. For example: porcelet, piglet, from porc; oiselet, fledgling, from oiseau, bird. However, in many cases the names for baby animals are not diminutives—that is, unlike chaton/chat or chiot/chien, they are not derived from the word for the adult animal: poulain, foal (an adult horse is a cheval); agneau, lamb (an adult sheep is un mouton or either une brebis, a female sheep, or un bélier, a male sheep). French is not unique in this, but it is indicated here to clarify that not all names of animals can be turned into diminutives by the addition of diminutive endings.

In Old French, -et/-ette, -in/-ine, -el/-elle were often used, as Adeline for Adele, Maillet for Maill, and so on. As well, the ending -on was used for both genders, as Alison and Guion from Alice and Guy respectively. The Germanic side of Vulgar Latin bore proper diminutives -oc and -uc, which went into words such as the Latin pocca and pucca, to become French poche (pouch); -oche is in regular use to shorten words: cinéma → cinoche.

==== Italian ====
In Italian, the diminutive is expressed by several derivational suffixes, applied to nouns or adjectives to create new nouns or adjectives with variable meanings. The new word is then pluralized as a word in its own right. Such derived words often have no equivalent in other languages.

- -ello, -ella: finestra → finestrella (window → little window), campana → campanello (bell→ little bell, also meaning handbell, doorbell and bike bell) or → campanella (bell→ little bell, also meaning school bell);
- -etto, -etta, the most used one along with -ino: casa → casetta (house → little house), povero → poveretto (poor / unfortunate person →poor little guy), cane → cagnetto (dog → little dog); may also be applied affectionately to names, usually female names: Laura → Lauretta, Paola→ Paoletta
- -ino, -ina, the most used one along with -etto: paese → paesino (village → little village); also in baby talk and after other suffixes: bello → bellino (pretty), gatto → gattino (kitten);
- -uccio, -uccia, similar to -ello/-ella, -etto/-etta and -ino/-ina, it is generally a loving, benign, courtesy, or affectionate diminutive suffix: tesoro→tesoruccio (literally "treasure," but used as an Italian term of endearment → little treasure), amore → amoruccio (Amore literally means "love", but it is often used to affectionately address someone in same sense as darling or other similar terms of endearment, just as "love" can be used as a term of endearment in English → little darling / little love); may also be applied affectionately to names: Michele→Micheluccio, Guido→ Guiduccio. Like many diminutives, it may also be patronizing or pejorative if used in a certain context: medico→ medicuccio (medical doctor → literally, "little doctor," used to call someone a quack), femmina → femminuccia (female→literally, a "little girl", but colloquially refers to a weak, effeminate, effete, or cowardly male person). In Southern Italy, especially Sicily, this diminutive becomes -uzzo or -uzza.
- -iccio, -iccia
- -icchio, -icchia, mainly of regional use, often pejorative: sole → solicchio (sun → weak sun);
- -otto, -otta, often attenuating: aquila → aquilotto (eagle → baby eagle), stupido → stupidotto (stupid → rather stupid);

Double diminutives, with two diminutive suffixes rather than one, are also possible: casa → casetta → casettina (house → small house → very small house), giovane → giovanotto → giovanottino (something like a young man, a lad, a youngster, etc.).

Suffixes -accio, -accia (rarely -azzo, -azza), -astro, -astra and -ucolo, -ucola, also exist, but they are used to form pejorative words, with no diminutive meaning: tempo → tempaccio (weather → bad or foul weather), popolo → popolaccio (people → bad people, riffraff, dregs of society), amore → amorazzo (love → frivolous, short-term love story), giallo → giallastro (yellow → yellowish, sallow), poeta → poetucolo or poetastro (poet → rhymester, poetaster)

Such suffixes are of Latin origin, except -etto and -otto, which are of unclear origin.

There also exist:

- some additional hypocoristic suffixes that are used to create new adjectives from other adjectives (or, sometimes, from nouns): -iccio/a, -icciolo/a, -igno/a, -ognolo/a, -occio/a (of Latin origin, except the last one, whose origin is unclear).
- the masculine augmentative suffixes, -one, normally used for feminine nouns too instead of the rarer -ona.

===== Italian loanwords in English =====
Examples of Italian diminutive words used in English are mostly culinary, like spaghetti (plural diminutive of "spago", meaning "thin string" or "twine"), linguine (named for its resemblance to little tongues ("lingue", in Italian)), bruschetta and zucchini. The diminution is often figurative: an operetta is similar to an opera, but dealing with less serious topics. "Signorina" means "Miss"; with "signorino" (Master) they have the same meanings as señorita and señorito in Spanish.

==== Portuguese ====
In Portuguese, diminutives can be formed with a wide range of endings but the most common diminutives are formed with the suffixes -(z)inho, -(z)inha, replacing the masculine and feminine endings -o and -a, respectively. The variants -(z)ito and -(z)ita, direct analogues of Spanish -(c)ito and -(c)ita, are also common in some regions. The forms with a z are normally added to words that end in stressed vowels, such as café → cafezinho. Some nouns have slightly irregular diminutives.

Noun diminutives are widely used in the vernacular. Occasionally, this process is extended to pronouns (pouco, a little → pouquinho or poucochinho, a very small amount), adjectives (e.g. bobo → bobinho, meaning respectively "silly" and "a bit silly"; só → sozinho, both meaning "alone" or "lonely"), adverbs (depressa → depressinha, mean "quickly") and even verbs.

==== Galician ====
In Galician, the suffix -iño(a) is added to nouns and adjectives. It is occasionally added to adverbs, in contrast with other Romance languages: amodiño, devagariño, engordiño or the fossilized paseniño, all meaning "slowly".

==== Romanian ====
Romanian uses suffixes to create diminutives, most of these suffixes being of Latin or Slavic origin. Not only names, but adjectives, adverbs and pronouns can have diminutives as well, as in Portuguese, Polish and Russian.

Feminine suffixes

- -ea (ramură / rămurea = tree branch)
- -ică (bucată / bucățică = piece)
- -ioară (inimă / inimioară = heart)
- -ișoară (țară / țărișoară = country)
- -iță (fată / fetiță = girl)
- -ușcă (rață / rățușcă = duck)
- -uță (bunică / bunicuță = grandmother)

Masculine suffixes

- -aș (iepure / iepuraș = rabbit)
- -el (băiat / băiețel = boy)
- -ic (tată / tătic = father)
- -ior (dulap / dulăpior = locker)
- -ișor (pui / puișor = chicken)
- -uleț (urs / ursuleț = bear)
- -uș (cățel / cățeluș = dog)
- -uț (pat / pătuț = bed)

Adjectives

- frumos > frumușel (beautiful; pretty)

Adverbs

- repede > repejor (fast; quite fast)

Pronouns

- dumneata (you, polite form) > mata > mătăluță

(used to address children respectfully in a non-familial context)

- nimic (nothing) > nimicuța
- nițel (a little something)

==== Spanish ====
Spanish is a language rich in diminutives, and uses suffixes to create them:

- -ito/-ita, words ending in -o or -a (rata, "rat" → ratita; ojo, "eye" → ojito; cebolla, "onion" → cebollita); for adjectives, it is used in an assertive manner.
- -cito/-cita, a variant of -ito/-ita used for words ending in -e or another consonant (león, "lion" → leoncito; café, "coffee" → cafecito).
- -illo/-illa (flota; "fleet" → flotilla; guerra, "war" → guerrilla; cámara, "chamber" → camarilla); for adjectives, it is used in an approximative manner.
- -ico/-ica, words ending in -to and -tro (plato, "plate" → platico), commonly used in Antilles, Colombia and Venezuela for words ending in -to and -tro, but also common with any kind of nouns in Aragon or Murcia.
- -ín/-ina (pequeño/a, "little" → pequeñín(a); muchacho, "boy" → muchachín)
- -ete/-eta (perro, "dog" → perrete; pandero, "tambourine" → pandereta).
- -ingo/-inga, words ending in -o, -a, -e or consonant commonly used in lowland Bolivian Spanish, (chico, "boy/girl" → chiquito → chiquitingo/chiquitinga (double diminutive))

Other less common suffixes are

- -uelo/-uela (pollo, "chicken" → polluelo)
- -zuelo/-zuela [pejorative] (ladrón, "thief" → landronzuelo)
- -uco/-uca (nene, "children" → nenuco)
- -ucho/-ucha [pejorative] (médico, "doctor" → medicucho)
- -ijo/-ija (lagarto, "lizard" → lagartija "wall lizard")
- -izno/-izna (lluvia, "rain" → llovizna "drizzle")
- -ajo/-aja (miga, "crumb" → migaja)
- -ino/-ina (niebla, "fog" → neblina)

Some speakers use a suffix in a word twice (double diminutive), which gives a more affectionate or stronger sense to the word.

- chico, "small" → chiquito → chiquitito/a, chiquitico/a, chiquitín(a) and even chirriquitico ("really really small").
- poco, "few" → poquito → poquitito ("tiny bit").
- pie, "foot" → piecito → piececito, piececillo.

Sometimes alternating different suffixes can change the meaning.

- (la) mano, "hand" → manita (or manito), "little hand", or manilla "bracelet", or manecilla, "clock/watch hand".
- caña, "cane" → canilla, literally "small cane" but actually "water tap" or, in some places, "baguette".

Adverbs can be added diminutive suffixes too, generally giving an affectionate sense to the word.

- lento "slowly" → lentito (or lentecito).
- rápido "quickly" → rapidito.
- mejor "best" → mejorcito.

==== Catalan ====
Catalan uses suffixes to create diminutives:

- -et/-eta, (braç, "arm" → bracet "small arm"; rata, "rat" → rateta "little rat"),
- -ó, -ona, (carro, "cart" → carretó "wheelbarrow"; Maria "Mary" (proper name) → Mariona)
- -ic/-ic, (Manel, "Emmanuel" (proper name) → Manelic)
- -í/-ina (corneta "cornet" → cornetí "soprano cornet")

More than one diminutive suffix can be applied to add more emphasis: e.g. rei, "king" → reietó (habitual epithet directed to a little child); panxa "belly" → panxolineta

Diminutives can also be applied to adjectives: e.g. petit, "small" → petitó.

Historically other suffixes have formed diminutives as well:

- -ell, -ella (porc "pig" → porcell "piglet") also -ol (fill "son" → fillol "godson")

Sometimes diminutives have changed their original meaning:

- llenç, "piece of material" → llençol, "bed sheet".

=== Baltic languages ===
==== Lithuanian ====
Lithuanian is known for its array of diminutive forms. Diminutives are generally constructed with suffixes applied to the noun stem. By far, the most common are those with -elis/-elė or -ėlis/-ėlė. Others include: -ukis/-ukė, -ulis/-ulė, -užis/-užė, -utis/-utė, -ytis/-ytė, etc. Suffixes may also be compounded, e.g.: -užis + -ėlis → -užėlis. In addition to denoting small size and/or endearment, they may also function as amplificatives (augmentatives), pejoratives (deterioratives), and to give special meanings, depending on context. Lithuanian diminutives are especially prevalent in poetic language, such as folk songs. Examples:

- ąžuolas (oak) → ąžuolėlis, ąžuoliukas
- brolis (brother) → brolelis, broliukas, brolytis, brolužis, brolužėlis, brolutytis, broliukėlis, etc.
- klevas (maple) → klevelis, klevukas, klevutis
- pakalnė (slope) → pakalnutė (Lily-of-the-valley, Convallaria)
- saulė (sun) → saulelė, saulytė, saulutė, saulužė, saulužėlė, etc.
- svogūnas (onion) → svogūnėlis (bulb), svogūniukas
- vadovas (leader) → vadovėlis (textbook, manual)

==== Latvian ====
In Latvian diminutives are widely used and are generally constructed with suffixes applied to the noun stem. Different diminutive forms can express smallness or intimacy: -iņš/-iņa, -sniņa, -tiņš/-tiņa, -ītis/-īte, derogative, uniqueness or insignificantness: -elis/-ele, -ulis/-ule, smallness and uniqueness: -ēns/ene, -uks. Sometimes double diminutives are derived: -elītis/-elīte, -ēntiņš, -ēniņš/-enīte. Diminutives are also often derived from adjectives and adjectives themselves in few cases can be used in diminutive forms.

Examples:

- laiva → laiviņa (boat)
- sirds → sirsniņa (heart)
- ūdens → ūdentiņš (water)
- brālis → brālītis (brother)
- nams → namelis (house)
- zirgs → zirģelis (horse)
- gudrs → gudrelis (smart → smart one)
- brālis → brālēns (brother→cousin)
- cālis → cālēns (chicken)
- lācis → lāčuks (bear)
- zirgs → zirģelis → zirģelītis (horse)
- kaķis → kaķēns → kaķēntiņš (cat)
- kuce → kucēns → kucēniņš (bitch → puppy)
- mazs → maziņš (small→very small)
- mīļš → mīlīgs (lovely)
- maza pele → maziņa pelīte (little mouse)

=== Slavic languages ===
==== Slovene ====
Slovene typically forms diminutives of nouns (e.g., čaj → čajček 'tea', meso → meseko 'meat'), but can also form diminutives of some verbs (e.g., božati → božkati 'to pet, stroke'; objemati → objemčkati 'to hug') and adjectives (e.g., bolan → bolančkan 'sick, ill').

==== Bosnian, Croatian and Serbian ====
Shtokavian dialect of Bosnian, Croatian and Serbian language most commonly use suffixes -ić, -ak (in some dialects -ek), -če for diminutives of masculine nouns, -ica for feminine nouns and names, and -ce, -ašce for neuter nouns.

Feminine:

- žaba (frog) → žabica
- lopta (ball) → loptica
- patka (duck) → patkica

Masculine:

- nos (nose) → nosić
- konj (horse) → konjić, konjče

Some masculine nouns can take two diminutive suffixes, -[a]k and -ić; in those cases, -k- becomes palatalized before -i to produce an ending -čić:

- sin (son) → sinčić (also sinak or sinek)
- momak (boy, bachelor, itself of diminutive origin) → momče, momčić

Neuter:

- pero (feather) → perce
- jezero (lake) → jezerce
- sunce (sun) → sunašce

Adjectives can have various diminutives, formed either by suffixation: kisel (sour) → kiselkast, plav (blue) → plavičast, or by prefixation: malen (small) → omalen, dugačak (long) → podugačak.

Kajkavian dialects form diminutives similarly to Slovene language.

==== Bulgarian ====
Bulgarian has an extended diminutive system.

Masculine nouns have a double diminutive form. The first suffix that can be added is -че, (-che). At this points the noun has become neuter, because of the -e ending. The -нце, (-ntse) suffix can further extend the diminutive (It is still neuter, again due to the -e ending). A few examples:

- kufar (suitcase) → kufarche → kufarchentse
- nozh (knife) → nozhche → nozhchentse
- stol (chair) → stolche → stolchentse

Feminine nouns can have up to three different, independent forms (though some of them are used only in colloquial speech):

- zhena (woman) → zhenica → zhenichka
- riba (fish) → ribka → ribchitsa
- saksiya (flowerpot) → saksiyka → saksiychitsa
- glava (head) → glavitsa → glavichka

Note that the suffixes can be any of -ка (-ka), -чка (-chka), and -ца (-tsa).

Neuter nouns usually have one diminutive variant, formed by adding variations of -це (-tse):

- dete (child) → detentse
- zhito (wheat grain) → zhittse
- sluntse (sun) → slunchitse

Adjectives have forms for each grammatical gender and these forms have their corresponding diminutive variant. The used suffixes are -ък (-uk) for masculine, -ка (-ka) for feminine and -ко (-ko) for neuter:

- maluk (small) → munichuk, malka → munichka, malko → munichko
- golyam (big) → golemichuk, golyama → golemichka, golyamo → golemichko

==== Czech ====
In Czech diminutives are formed by suffixes, as in other Slavic languages. Common endings include -ka, -ko, -ek, -ík, -inka, -enka, -ečka, -ička, -ul-, -unka, -íček, -ínek etc. The choice of suffix may depend on the noun's gender as well as the degree of smallness/affection that the speaker wishes to convey.

Czech diminutives can express smallness, affection, and familiarity. Hence, "Petřík" may well mean "our", "cute", "little" or "beloved" Peter. Some suffixes generally express stronger familiarity (or greater smallness) than others. The most common examples are the pairs -ek and -eček ("domek" – small house, "domeček" – very small house), and -ík and -íček ("Petřík" – small or beloved Peter, "Petříček" – very small or cute Peter), -ko and -ečko ("pírko" – small feather, "pírečko" – very small feather), and -ka and -ička/-ečka ("tlapka" – small paw, "tlapička" – very small paw; "peřinka" – small duvet, "peřinečka" – very small duvet). However, some words already have the same ending as if they were diminutives, but they aren't. In such cases, only one diminutive form is possible, e.g. "kočka" (notice the -ka ending) means "cat" (of normal size), "kočička" means "small cat".

Every noun has a grammatically correct diminutive form, regardless of the sense it makes. This is sometimes used for comic effect, for example diminuting the word "obr" (giant) to "obřík" (little giant). Speakers also tend to use longer endings, which are not grammatically correct, to express even stronger form of familiarity or cuteness, for example "miminečíčko" (very small and cute baby), instead of correct "miminko" and "miminečko". Such expressions are generally understood, but are used almost exclusively in emotive situations in spoken language and are only rarely written.

Some examples. Note the various stem mutations due to palatalisation, vowel shortening or vowel lengthening:

/-ka/ (mainly feminine noun forms)

- táta (dad) → taťka (daddy), Anna → Anka, Ivana → Ivanka, hora (mountain) → hůrka (a very small mountain or big hill), noha (leg, foot) → nožka (a little leg, such as on a small animal)

/-ko/ (neuter noun forms)

- rádio → rádijko, víno (wine) → vínko, triko (T-shirt) → tričko, pero (feather) → pírko, oko (eye) → očko

/-ek/ (masculine noun forms)

- dům (house) → domek, stůl (table) → stolek, schod (stair/step) → schůdek, prostor (space) → prostůrek, strom (tree) → stromek

/-ík/

- Tom (Tom) → Tomík (little/cute/beloved Tom = Tommy), pokoj (room) → pokojík, kůl (stake/pole) → kolík, rum (rum) → rumík, koš (basket) → košík

==== Polish ====
In Polish diminutives can be formed of nouns, adjectives, adverbs, and some other parts of speech. They literally signify physical smallness or lack of maturity, but usually convey attitude, in most cases affection. In some contexts, they may be condescending or ironic. Diminutives can cover a significant fraction of children's speech during the time of language acquisition.

For adjectives and adverbs, diminutives in Polish are grammatically separate from comparative forms.

There are multiple affixes used to create the diminutive. Some of them are -ka, -czka, -śka, -szka, -cia, -sia, -unia, -enka, -lka for feminine nouns and -ek, -yk, -ciek, -czek, -czyk, -szek, -uń, -uś, -eńki, -lki for masculine words, and -czko, -ko for neuter nouns, among others.

The diminutive suffixes may be stacked to create forms going even further, for example, malusieńki is considered even smaller than malusi or maleńki. Similarly, koteczek (little kitty) is derived from kotek (kitty), which is itself derived from kot (cat). Note that in this case, the suffix -ek is used twice, but changes to ecz once due to palatalization.

There are also diminutives that lexicalized, e.g., stołek (stool), which is grammatically a diminutive of stół (table).

In many cases, the possibilities for creation of diminutives are seemingly endless and leave room for the creation of many neologisms. Some examples of common diminutives:

Feminine

- żaba (frog) → żabka, żabcia, żabusia, żabeńka, żabuleńka, żabeczka, żabunia
- córka (daughter) → córeczka, córunia, córcia, córuś (Originally córka was created as diminutive from córa)
- kaczka (duck) → kaczuszka, kaczusia, kaczunia
- Katarzyna (Katherine) → Kasia, Kaśka, Kasieńka, Kasiunia, Kasiulka, Kasiuleczka, Kasiuneczka
- Anna (Anna) → Ania, Anka, Ańcia, Anusia, Anuśka, Aneczka, Anulka, Anuleczka
- Małgorzata (Margaret) → Małgorzatka, Małgosia, Małgośka, Gosia, Gosieńka, Gosiunia, Gosiula

Masculine

- chłopak (boy) → chłopaczek (Originally chłopak was created as diminutive from Old Polish chłop, which now means "peasant".)
- kot (cat) → kotek, koteczek, kociątko, kociak, kociaczek, kocio, kicia, kiciunia, kotuś, kotunio, kicio
- pies (dog) → piesek, pieseczek, piesio, piesiunio, psinka, psineczka, psiaczek
- Grzegorz (Gregory) → Grześ, Grzesiek, Grzesio, Grzesiu, Grzeniu, Grzenio
- Michał (Michael) → Michałek, Michaś, Misiek, Michasiek, Michaszek, Misiu, Minio
- Piotr (Peter) → Piotrek, Piotruś, Piotrusiek
- Tomasz (Thomas) → Tomek, Tomuś, Tomcio, Tomeczek, Tomaszek
- ptak (bird) → ptaszek, ptaszeczek, ptaś, ptasiątko

Neuter

- pióro (feather) → piórko, pióreczko
- serce (heart) → serduszko, serdeńko
- mleko (milk) → mleczko
- światło (light) → światełko
- słońce (sun) → słoneczko, słonko

Plural

- kwiaty (flowers) → kwiatki, kwiatuszki, kwiateczki

Adjectives

- mały (small) (masculine) → maleńki, malusi, malutki, maluśki, maciupki
- mała (small) (feminine) → maleńka, malusia, malutka, maluśka, maciupka
- zielony (green) (masculine) → zieloniutki
- zielonkawy (greenish) (masculine) → zieloniutkawy
- miękkie (soft) (neuter) → mięciutkie, mięciuchne

Adverbs

- prędko (fast) → prędziutko, prędziuteńko, prędziuśko, prędziusieńko
- prędzej (faster) → prędziusiej
- fajnie → fajniusio
- super → supcio

Verbs

- płakać (to weep) → płakuniać, płakuńciać, płakusiać

==== Russian ====
Russian has a wide variety of diminutive forms for names, to the point that for non-Russian speakers it can be difficult to connect a nickname to the original. Diminutive forms for nouns are usually distinguished with -ик, -ок, -ёк (-ik, -ok, -yok, masculine gender), -чк-, -шк-, -оньк- or -еньк- (-chk-, -shk-, -on'k-, -en'k-) infixes and suffixes. For example, вода (voda, water) becomes водичка (vodichka, affectionate name of water), кот (kot, male cat) becomes котик (kotik, affectionate name), кошка (koshka, female cat) becomes кошечка (koshechka, affectionate name), солнце (solntse, sun) becomes солнышко (solnyshko). Often there are many diminutive forms for one word: мама (mama, mom) becomes мамочка (mamochka, affectionate sense), мамуля (mamulya, affectionate and playful sense), маменька (mamen'ka, affectionate and old-fashioned), маманя (mamanya, affectionate but disdainful), - all of them have different hues of meaning, which are hard to understand for a foreigner, but are very perceptible for a native speaker. Sometimes you can combine several diminutive suffixes to make several degrees of diminution: пирог (pirog, a pie) becomes пирожок (pirozhok, a small pie, or an affectionate name), which then may become пирожочек (pirozhochek, a very small pie, or an affectionate name). The same with сыр (syr, cheese), сырок (syrok, an affectionate name or a name of a small packed piece of cheese, see the third paragraph), сырочек (syrochek, an affectionate name). In both cases the first suffix -ок changes к to ч, when the suffix -ек is added.

Often formative infixes and suffixes look like diminutive ones. The well-known word, водка (vodka), has the suffix, "-ka", which is not a diminutive, but formative, the word has a different meaning (not water, but a drink) and has its own diminutive suffix -ochka: водочка (vodochka) is an affectionate name of vodka (compare voda - vodichka). There are many examples of this kind: сота (sota, a honeycomb) and сотка (sotka, one hundred sqr. meter), труба (truba, a tube) and трубка (trubka, a special kind of a tube: telephone receiver, TV tube, tobacco pipe - in all these cases there is no diminutive sense). However, трубка also means a small tube (depending on context). But most of the time you can tell diminutive particle from formative by simply omitting the suffix. If the meaning of a word remains, the suffix is diminutive. For example: кучка (kuchka, a small pile) -> куча (kucha, a pile) - the general meaning remains, it is a diminutive form, but тачка (tachka, wheelbarrow) -> тача (tacha, no such word) - the general meaning changes, it is not a diminutive form, потолок (potolok, ceiling) -> потол (potol, no such word) - the same with masculine gender.

There is one more peculiarity. For example, the word конь (kon', a male horse) has a diminutive form конёк (koniok). But конёк (koniok) also means a skate (ice-skating, no diminutive sense in this case), and has another diminutive form конёчек (koniochek, a small skate). The word конёк also means a gable with no diminutive sense.

Adjectives and adverbs can also have diminutive forms with infix -еньк- (-en'k-): синий (siniy, blue) becomes синенький (sinen'kiy), быстро (bystro, quickly) becomes быстренько (bystren'ko). In case of adjectives the use of diminutive form is aimed to intensify the effect of diminutive form of a noun. Diminutive forms of adverbs are used to express either benevolence in the speech or on the contrary to express superciliousness, depending on the inflection of a whole phrase.

Some diminutives of proper names, among many others:

Feminine

- Anastasiya → Nastya (as in Nastya Liukin), Nasten'ka, Nastyona
- Anna → Anya, An'ka, Anka, Anechka, Annushka, Anyuta, Nyura, Nyuta, Nyusha
- Irina → Ira, Irka, Irinka, Irinushka, Irochka, Irisha
- Natalya → Natasha, Natashka, Natashen'ka, Nata, Natalka
- Tatyana → Tanya, Tan'ka, Tanechka, Tanyusha, Tata, Tanchik
- Yelizaveta → Liza, Lizochka, Lizka, Lizon'ka, Lizaveta
- Yekaterina → Katya, Katyusha, Katen'ka, Kat'ka, Katechka, Katerina
- Yevgeniya → Zhenya, Zhen'ka, Zhenechka, Zheka

Masculine

- Aleksander → Sasha, Sashka, Sashen'ka, Sashechka, Sanya, Shura, Sashok, Shurik
- Aleksey → Alyosha (as in Alyosha Popovich), Alyoshka, Alyoshen'ka, Lyosha, Lyoshka, Lyoshen'ka, Leksey
- Andrej → Andryusha, Andryushka, Andryushechka, Dyusha, Andreika
- Anton → Antosha, Antoshka, Tosha, Toshka
- Dmitriy → Dima, Mitya, Dimka, Dimushka, Dimochka, Miten'ka, Dimok, Diman, Dimon, Mityai
- Ivan → Vanya, Van'ka, Vanechka, Vanyusha, Vanyushka, Ivanushka
- Mikhail → Misha, Mishka, Mishen'ka, Mishechka, Mishutka, Mikhei, Mikhailo
- Pyotr → Petya, Pet'ka, Peten'ka, Petyunya
- Sergej → Seryoga, Seryozha, Seryozhka, Seryozhen'ka, Seryi
- Vladimir → Volodya, Voloden'ka, Vova, Vovka, Vovochka, Vovan, Vovchik

=== Celtic languages ===
==== Irish ====
In the Irish language diminutives are formed by adding -ín, and sometimes -án.

- Rós (Rose) > Róisín (Rosalie, Rosaleen)
- Seán > Seáinín (Johnny)
- Séamas > Séamaisín, Jimín
- Pádraig > Páidín (Paddy)
- bóthar (road) > bóithrín (country lane)
- caile > cailín (girl) [origin of the name Colleen]
- fear (man) > firín, also feairín, (little man)
- teach, also tigh, (house) > tigín, also teaichín
- cloch (stone) > cloichín (pebble)
- sráid (street) > sráidín (lane, alleyway)
- séipéal (chapel) > séipéilín (small chapel)

This suffix is also used to create the female equivalent of some male names:

- Pádraig > Pádraigín (Patricia)
- Gearóid (Gerald/Gerard) > Gearóidín (Geraldine)
- Pól (Paul) > Póilín (Paula)

-án as a diminutive suffix is much less frequent nowadays (though it was used extensively as such in Old Irish).

- leabhar (book) > leabhrán (booklet, manual, handbook)
- cnoc (hill) > cnocán (hillock)

It could also be used ironically, for example bolgadán (little belly) was used to denote someone who had a large belly and an oileán (little rock) became the name for an island.

==== Scottish Gaelic ====
Scottish Gaelic has two inherited diminutive suffixes of which only one (-(e)ag) is considered productive.

- -(e)ag, feminine: Mòr ("Sarah") → Mòrag, Loch Nis (Loch Ness) → Niseag ("Nessie")
- -(e)an, masculine: loch → lochan, bodach (old man) → bodachan (mannikin)

=== Greek ===
==== Ancient Greek ====
Several diminutive derivational suffixes existed in Ancient Greek. The most common ones were -ιο-, -ισκο-/-ισκᾱ-, -ιδ-ιο-, -αρ-ιο-. Often there is phonetic change in the transition from the nominative case forms to the oblique cases, with the diminutives based on the oblique form, as in the examples of ξίφος and παῖς below, in which the diminutive is based on a dental consonant instead of the sibilant ending of the nominative form.

Original noun		Diminutive	
ἄνθρωπος ánthrōpos	"person"	ἀνθρωπίσκος anthrōpískos	"mannequin"
βίβλος bíblos	"papyrus"	βιβλίον biblíon	"paper", "book"
ξίφος xíphos	"sword"	ξιφίδιον xiphídion	"dagger"
παῖς pais	"child"	παιδάριον paidárion	"little child"

==== Modern Greek ====
Diminutives are very common in Modern Greek with every noun having its own diminutive. They express either small size or affection: size -aki (σπίτι/spiti "house", σπιτάκι/spitaki "little house"; λάθος/lathos "mistake", λαθάκι/lathaki "negligible mistake") or affection -ula (μάνα/mana "mother", μανούλα/manula "mommy"). The most common suffixes are -άκης/-akis and -ούλης/-ulis for the male gender, -ίτσα/-itsa and -ούλα/-ula for the female gender, and -άκι/-aki for the neutral gender. Several of them are common as suffixes of surnames, originally meaning the offspring of a certain person, e.g. Παπάς/Papas "priest" with Παπαδάκης/Papadakis as the surname.

=== Indic languages ===
==== Hindi ====
In Hindi, some common nouns and adjectives which are declinable and some which end in a consonant can be made diminutive by changing the end gender-marking vowel आ (ā) or ई (ī) to ऊ (ū) or by adding the vowel to ऊ (ū) respectively.

Noun or adjective			Diminutive	
kid	बच्चा	baccā	बच्चू	baccū
kid	बच्ची	baccī	बच्चू	baccū
fat	मोटा	moʈā	मोटू	moʈū
fat	मोटी	moʈī	मोटू	moʈū
round	गोल	gol	गोलू	golū

For some inanimate masculine nouns which end in the vowel आ (ā), feminising it by changing the आ (ā) end vowel to ई (ī) can make it diminutive.

Nouns or adjective			Diminutive	
Hammer	हथौड़ा	hathauɽā	हथौड़ी	hathauɽī
Letter, Chit	पर्चा	parcā	पर्ची	parcī
Leaf	पत्ता	pattā	पत्ती	pattī
Box	डब्बा	dabbā	डब्बी	dabbī

Some proper nouns are made diminutive with ऊ (-u). This is most often applied to children's names, though lifelong nicknames can result:

Nouns or adjective		Diminutive	
राजीव	rājīv	राजू	rājū
अनीता	anītā	नीतू	nītū
अंजलि	anjalī	अंजू	anjū

==== Punjabi ====
In Punjabi, oftentimes feminine inanimate nouns tend be diminutives of a masculine noun. This change can be brought by replacing the vowel ā by ī. Most diminutives just differ in size from the base word.

- ḍabbā ڈبا ਡੱਬਾ (box) → ḍabbī ڈبی ਡੱਬੀ (case)
- sūā سووا ਸੂਆ → sūī سوئی ਸੂਈ (needle)

With animals, there may sometimes be a change in meaning.

- kīṛā کیڑا ਕੀੜਾ (insect) → kīṛī کیڑی ਕੀੜੀ (ant)

==== Haryanvi ====
In Haryanvi, proper nouns are made diminutive with 'u' (unisex), 'da' (masculine), 'do' (masculine) and 'di' (feminine). This is of course most often applied to children's names, though lifelong nicknames can result:

- Bharat → Bhartu: demonstrates the use of 'u' for a male
- Vaishali → Vishu: demonstrates the use of 'u' for a female
- Amit → Amitada: demonstrates the use of 'da' for a male
- Vishal → Vishaldo: demonstrates the use of 'do' for a male
- Sunita → Sunitadi: demonstrates the use of 'di' for a female

==== Magahi ====
In Magahi, proper nouns are made diminutive with -a or -wa. This is of course most often applied to children's names, though lifelong nicknames can result:

- Raushan → Raushna
- Vikash → Vikashwa
- Anjali → Anjalia

==== Marathi ====
In Marathi, masculine proper nouns are made diminutive with -ya or -u, while feminine proper nouns use -u and sometimes -ee. This is of course most often applied to children's names, though lifelong nicknames can result.

Masculine :

- Abhijit (अभिजित) → Abhya (अभ्या)
- Rajendra (राजेंद्र) → Rajya (राज्या), Raju (राजू)

Feminine :

- Ashwini (अश्विनी) → Ashu (अशू)
- Namrata (नम्रता) → Namee (नमी), Namu (नमू)

==== Sinhala ====
In Sinhala, proper nouns are made diminutive with -a after usually doubling the last pure consonant, or adding -iya. In doing so, often the last few characters are dropped.

- Rajitha → Rajja or Rajiya
- Romesh → Romma or Romiya
- Sashika → Sashsha or Sashiya
- Ramith → Ramma or Ramiya

Sometimes, you don't double the last constant or don't add -iya after dropping the last few characters.

- Rajitha → Raj
- Dhanushka → Dhanu

It seems that the sound is the decisive factor here, so it might be useless to find some grammatical devices here. For example, the proper noun (name) Wickramananayaka can make the diminutive Wicky. Here, only the first syllable is what is focused on. Therefore, Wicky can be the diminutive of all forms of names that start with Wick, like Wickramasinghe, Wickramaratne, Wickramabahu, and so on.

=== Iranian languages ===
==== Kurdish ====
Northern Kurdish or Kurmanji uses mostly "-ik" suffix to make diminutive forms:

- keç (girl, daughter) → keçik (little girl)
- hirç (bear) → hirçik (teddybear)

-ûç\-oç; kiçoç, piçûç. -il; zengil, çingil. -çe\-çik; baxçe, rûçik. -ole; hirçole, kiçole. -ok; kiçkok, berxok, derok. ...etc.

==== Persian ====
The most frequently used Persian diminutives are -cheh (چه-) and -ak (ک-).

- bâgh باغ (garden) → bâghcheh باغچه (small garden)
- mard مرد (man) → mardak مردک (this fellow)

Other less used ones are -izeh and -zheh.

- rang رنگ (colour) → rangizeh رنگیزه (pigment)
- nây نای (pipe) → nâyzheh نایژه (small pipe, bronchus)

=== Armenian ===
Armenian diminutive suffixes are -ik, -ak and -uk. For example, the diminutive forms of տատ (tat, grandmother), գետ (get, river) and գայլ (gayl, wolf) are տատիկ (tatik), գետակ (getak), and գայլուկ (gayluk), respectively.

== Semitic languages ==
=== Arabic ===
In Modern Standard Arabic the usual diminutive pattern is FuʿayL (CuCayC), FuʿayyeL, and FuʿayyeiL with or without the feminine -a added:

- kūt كوت (fort) → kuwayt كويت (little fort)
- kitāb كِتاب (book) → kutayyeb كتيّب (booklet)
- hirra هِرّة (cat) → hurayra هُرَيرة (kitten)
- kalb كلب (dog) → kulayb كليب (doggie)
- najm نجم (star) → nujaym نجيم (starlet)
- jabal جبل (mountain) → jubayl جبيل (little mountain)

In certain varieties of Arabic (e.g. Egyptian), reduplication of the last syllable is also used (similarly to Hebrew), as in:

- baṭṭa بطة (duck) → baṭṭūṭa بطوطة (small duck)
- Qamar قمر (moon) → Qammūra قمورة (little moon, refers to a beautiful woman or girl)
- Bint بنت (girl) → Bannūta بنوتة (little girl)

=== Hebrew ===
Hebrew employs a reduplication pattern of its last syllable to mark diminutive forms.

- kélev כלב (dog) : klavláv כלבלב (doggie)
- khatúl חתול (cat) : khataltúl חתלתול (kitty)
- batsál בצל (onion) : b'tsaltsál בצלצל (shallot)
- adóm אדום (red) : adamdám אדמדם (reddish)
- dag דג (fish) : dagíg דגיג (small fish)

Also, the suffixes -on and -it sometimes mark diminutive forms; sometimes the former is masculine and the latter is feminine.

- kóvaʿ כובע (hat) : kovaʿón כובעון (small cap, also means condom)
- yéled ילד (child) : yaldón ילדון ("kid")
- sak שק (sack) : sakít שקית (bag; e.g. 'sakít plástik', a plastic bag)
- kaf כף (spoon) : kapít כפית (teaspoon)

Names can be made diminutive by substituting the last syllable for suffixes such as "-ik", "-i" or "-le", sometimes slightly altering the name for pronunciation purposes. At times, a syllable can be omitted to create an independent diminutive name, to which any of the suffixes mentioned earlier can be applied. In some cases, reduplication works as well.

- Aryé אריה : Ári ארי
- Ariél אריאל : Árik אריק
- Adám אדם : Ádamke אדמ'קה
- Mikhaél מיכאל : Míkha מיכה
- Aharón אהרון : Á(ha)rale אהר'לה or Rón רון, which in turn can produce Róni רוני
- Davíd דוד : Dúdu דודו, which in turn can produce Dúdi דודי

== Sino-Tibetan languages ==
=== Chinese ===
Diminutives in Chinese are typically formed in one of three ways: by repetition or by the addition of a "cute" prefix or suffix.

Chinese given names are usually one or two characters in length. The single character or the second of the two characters can be doubled to make it sound cuter. Some given names, such as Sun Feifei's, are already formed in this way. Throughout China, the single character or the second of the two characters can also be prefixed by "Little" (小, xiǎo) or—mostly in Southern China—by "Ah" (阿, ā) to produce an affectionate or derisive diminutive name. For example, Andy Lau (劉德華, Liú Déhuá) might be referred to as "Little Wah" (小華, Xiǎohuá) or "Ah-Wah" (阿華, Āhuá).

In Cantonese, "child" (仔, zai²) is also used as a diminutive suffix. Andy Lau's more common nickname in Hong Kong is "Wah Zai" (華仔, Waa⁴-zai²). Cute suffixes in Mandarin include "-a" (啊, a) and -ya (呀, yā).

== Turkic languages ==
=== Turkish ===
See also Turkish grammar

Turkish diminutive suffixes are -cik and -ceğiz, and variants thereof as dictated by the consonant assimilation and vowel harmony rules of Turkish grammar.

-cik is applied in cases of endearment and affection, in particular toward infants and young children by exaggerating qualities such as smallness and youth, whereas -ceğiz is used in situations of compassion and empathy, especially when expressing sympathy toward another person in times of difficulty. Note the effects of vowel harmony in the following examples:

- köy (village) → köyceğiz (dear little village, also a place name)
- kadın (woman) → kadıncağız (poor dear woman)
- çocuk (child) → çocukçağız (poor dear child)
- kedi (cat) → kedicik (cute little cat, kitten)
- köpek (dog) → köpecik (cute little dog, puppy)
- kitap (book) kitapçık (little book, pamphlet)

It's not common, but some adjectives may also have diminutives.

- küçük (little) → küçücük (tiny)
- sıcak (hot) → sıcacık (cozy, warm)
- çabuk (quick) → çabucak (quickly) → çabucacık (in no time)

There are a few exceptions; gülücük (giggle) is derived from the verb gülmek (to laugh), but it's not considered a diminutive. Çocuk (kid, child) is not a diminutive, and it can't take a diminutive suffix. Kılçık (fish bone) may look like a diminutive, but it's not related to kıl (body hair) anyway. And kızılcık (dogwood, dogberry) is not a diminutive of kızıl (bright red), and gelincik (weasel) is not a diminutive of gelin (bride). (see also: Mehmetçik)

== Uralic languages ==
=== Estonian ===
The diminutive suffix of Estonian is "-kene" in its long form, but can be shortened to "-ke". In all grammatical cases except for the nominative and partitive singular, the "-ne" ending becomes "-se". It is fully productive and can be used with every word. Some words, such as "päike(ne)" (sun), "väike(ne)" (little) or "pisike(ne)" (tiny), are diminutive in their basic form, the diminutive suffix cannot be removed from these words. The Estonian diminutive suffix can be used recursively - it can be attached to a word more than once. Forms such as "pisikesekesekene", having three diminutive suffixes, are grammatically legitimate. As is demonstrated by the example, in recursive usage all but the last diminutive "-ne" suffix become "-se" as in forms inflected by case.

=== Finnish ===
The diminutive suffixes of Finnish "-ke", "-kka", and "-nen" are not universal, and cannot be used on every noun. The feature is common in Finnish surnames, f.e. 'Jokinen' could translate 'Streamling', but since this form is not used in speaking about streams, the surname could also mean 'lands by the stream' or 'lives by the stream'. Double diminutives also occur in certain words f.e. lapsukainen (child, not a baby anymore), lapsonen (small child), lapsi (child).

Examples:

  - -ke: haara (branch) → haarake (little branch), nimi (name) → nimike (label, tag)
  - -kka: peni (dog (archaic)) → penikka (whelp, pup), nenä (nose) → nenukka (little nose)
  - -nen: lintu (bird) → lintunen (little bird), poika (boy, son) → poikanen (little boy, animal offspring)

=== Hungarian ===
Hungarian uses the suffixes -ka/ke and -cska/cske to form diminutive nouns. The suffixes -i and -csi may also be used with names. However, you traditionally cannot have the diminutive form of your name registered officially in Hungary (although a few of the most common diminutive forms have been registered as possible legal first names in the past years). Nouns formed this way are considered separate words (as all words that are formed using képző type suffixes). They may not even be grammatically related to the base word, only historically, whereas the relation has been long forgotten.

Some examples:

- Animals
  - -us: kutya → kutyus (dog), cica → cicus (cat)
  - -ci: medve → maci (bear), borjú → boci (calf), liba → libuci (goose)
  - -ka/-ke: madár → madárka (bird), egér → egérke (mouse)
  - -cska/-cske: hal → halacska, méh → méhecske (bee)
- Names
  - -i: János → Jani, Júlia → Juli, Kata → Kati, Mária → Mari, Sára → Sári, Gergő/Gergely → Geri, Domo(n)kos → Domi
  - -i-ka/ke: János → Janika, Júlia → Julika, Mária → Marika, Ferenc → Ferike, Teréz(ia) → Terike
  - -csi: János → Jancsi, Júlia → Julcsi, Mária → Marcsi
  - -iska/-iske/-uska: Júlia → Juliska, Mária → Mariska, Ilona → Iluska
  - -us: Béla → Bélus, Júlia/Judit → Jucus
  - -ci: László → Laci, Júlia/Judit → Juci, Anna → Anci
  - -có: Ferenc → Fecó, József → Jocó
  - -ca: Ilona → Ica, László → Laca
  - -tya: Péter → Petya, Zoltán → Zotya
  - -nyi: Sándor → Sanyi, Mária → Manyi

Note that these are all special diminutive suffixes. The universal -ka/ke and -cska/cske can be used to create further diminutive forms, e.g. kutyuska (little doggy), cicuska (little kitty). Theoretically, more and more diminutive forms can be created this way, e.g. kutyuskácskácska (little doggy-woggy-snoggy). Of course, this is not a common practice; the preferred translations are kutyulimutyuli (doggy-woggy) and cicamica (kitty-witty).

== Bantu languages ==
=== Chichewa ===
Chichewa noun class 12 and 13 contain diminutive prefixes. The prefixes are ka (12) for singular nouns and ti (13) for plural nouns. These classes do not contain any words as opposed to the augmentative marker, which is also a regular noun class containing nouns.

- mwana (child) → kamwana (little child)
- ana (children) → tiana (little children)

=== Ikyaushi ===
Ikyaushi expresses the diminutive using the nominal class prefixes aka- (Class 12) and utu- (Class 13), representing the singular and plural forms respectively. Both of these nominal classes also contain lexical items that are not characterized by diminution, as found in Spier's (2020) descriptive grammar, such as akashimi ('story') and utubuki ('honey'). Interestingly, these prefixes can also be attached to non-nominal roots, such as the adjectival -noonoo in akanoonoo ('something small'). Additional examples can be found below.

- inama → akanama ('a little piece of meat/flesh')
- ikyuuni → akauni ('a small bird') / utuuni ('small birds')
- mbushi → utubushi ('little goats')
- umuti → utumuti ('little trees')
- ifibwesela → utubwesela ('small pumpkins')

=== seSotho ===
In the Sotho languages (South Sotho, Setswana, and Sesotho sa Lebowa), the diminunitive is formed with variants of the -ana suffix.

- mošemane (boy) → mošemanyana (small boy)
- koloi (car, wagon) → koloinyana (small car)
- kolobe (pig) → kolobjana (piglet)

== Algonquian languages ==
=== Cree ===
Cree uses two basic diminutives.

- -iš (-is in the western dialects) to indicate a smaller version of a noun:

sâkahikan (lake) → sâkahikaniš (small lake)

- -išiš (-isis in the western dialects) to indicate either a very small version of a noun or a young version of the noun:

sâkahikaniš (small lake) → sâkahikanišiš (pond)

In both diminutives, sound changes may be triggered as ⟨t⟩→⟨c⟩ in most dialects, and ⟨s⟩→⟨š⟩ in the eastern dialects.

- atim (dog) → acimošiš (puppy)

=== Ojibwe ===
Ojibwe has several different types of diminutive suffixes.

- Adorative-diminutive: /ish/

anim /animw/ (dog) → animosh /animwish/ (doggy)

- Affective-diminutive: /iz(s)/

ikwe (woman) → ikwes (dear woman)

- Productive-diminutive, a.k.a. "diminutive": /enz(s)/

ikwes /ikwez(s)/ (dear woman) → ikwezens /ikwezenz(s)/ (girl)

The following diminutives palatize (noted as /y_/) all the preceding ⟨d⟩ → ⟨j⟩, ⟨s⟩ → ⟨sh⟩, ⟨t⟩ → ⟨ch⟩, ⟨z⟩ → ⟨zh⟩.

- Pejorative-diminutive, a.k.a. "pejorative": /y_ish/

ikwezens /ikwezenz(s)/ (girl) → ikwezhenzhish /ikwezyenzyish/ (bad girl)

- Contemptive-diminutive, a.k.a. "contemptive": /y_eny(h)/

gwiiwizens /gwiiwizenz(s)/ (boy) → gwiiwizhenzhenh /gwiiwizyenzyeny(h)/ (no-good boy)

- Verbal diminutive: /y_ijiiny(h)/

animokaa (be abundant with dogs) → animokaajiinh (bitch)

== International auxiliary languages ==
=== Esperanto ===
For generic use (for living beings and inanimate objects), Esperanto has a single diminutive suffix, "-et".

- domo (house) → dometo (cottage)
- knabo (boy) → knabeto (little boy)
- varma (warm) → varmeta (lukewarm)

For personal names and familial forms of address, the affixes "-nj-" and "-ĉj-" are used, for females and males respectively. Unusually for Esperanto, the "root" is often shortened.

- patrino (mother) → panjo (mum, mommy)
- patro (father) → paĉjo (dad(dy))
- Aleksandra (Alexandra) → Alenjo (Sandra)
- Aleksandro (Alexander) → Aleĉjo (Sandro)
- Johano (John) → Joĉjo (Johnny)
- Maria (Mary) → Manjo
- Sofia (Sophie) → Sonjo
- Vilhelmo (William) → Vilĉjo (Bill(y), Will(y))

Whereas languages such as Spanish may use the diminutive to denote offspring, as in "perrito" (pup), Esperanto has a dedicated and regular suffix, "-id" used for this purpose. Thus "hundeto" means "little dog" (such as a dog of a small breed), while "hundido" means a dog who is not yet fully grown.

=== Interlingua ===
See also Free word-building in Interlingua.

Interlingua has a single diminutive suffix, -ett, for diminutives of all sorts.

- Johannes (John) → Johannetto (Johnny)
- camera (chamber, room) → cameretta (little room)
- pullo (chicken) → pulletto (chick)

Use of this suffix is flexible, and diminutives such as mama and papa may also be used. To denote a small person or object, many Interlingua speakers simply use the word parve, or small:

- parve can → small dog
- parve arbore → small tree
