= Marty Barrett =

Marty Barrett may refer to:

- Marty Barrett (catcher) (1860–1910), 19th-century baseball catcher
- Marty Barrett (second baseman) (born 1958), Major League Baseball second baseman, primarily for the Boston Red Sox
- Marty Barrett (hurler) (1951–2009), Irish hurler
