= Marty Barrett (hurler) =

Irish hurler

Personal information
- Native name: Máirtín Bairéid (Irish)
- Born: 1951 Ballymacward, County Galway, Ireland
- Died: 23 September 2009 (aged 57–58) Wexford, Ireland
- Occupation: Secondary school teacher

Sport
- Sport: Hurling
- Position: Right corner-forward
Clubs
- Years: Club
- Pádraig Pearse's; St Brendan's; Faythe Harriers
Club titles
- Dublin titles: 1
Inter-county*
Years	County	Apps (scores)
1974-1978	Galway	7 (3-3)
Inter-county titles
- All-Irelands: 0
- NHL: 1
- All Stars: 0
- *Inter County team apps and scores correct as of 19:04, 3 February 2014.

Martin "Marty" Barrett (1951 – 23 September 2009) was an Irish hurler who played as a right corner-forward for the Galway senior team.

Born in Ballymacward, County Galway, Barrett first played competitive hurling whilst at school at Garbally College. He made his first impression on the inter-county scene when he joined the Galway under-21 team. He made his senior debut during the 1974 championship. Barrett went on to play a key role for Galway for over a brief period, and won one National Hurling League medal. He was an All-Ireland runner-up on one occasion.

As a member of the Connacht inter-provincial team, Barrett enjoyed little success in the Railway Cup. At club level he was a one-time championship medallist with St Brendan's. In addition to this he also won two Connacht medals and three championship medals. Barrett also lined out with Pádraig Pearse's GAA and Faythe Harriers.

Throughout his career Barrett made seven championship appearances for Galway. His retirement came following the conclusion of the 1978 championship.

In retirement from playing, Barrett became involved in team management and coaching. He enjoyed a lengthy spell as hurling coach at St. Peter's College, Wexford.

== Honours ==
=== Player ===
St Brendan's

- Dublin Senior Club Hurling Championship (1): 1980

University College Dublin

- Fitzgibbon Cup (1): 1972

Galway

- National Hurling League (1): 1974-75
- All-Ireland Under-21 Hurling Championship (1): 1972
