= Diminutive =

Word modified to convey a slighter degree

A diminutive is a word obtained by modifying a root word to convey a slighter degree of its root meaning, either to convey the smallness of the object or quality named, or to convey a sense of intimacy or endearment, and sometimes to belittle something or someone. A diminutive form (abbreviated DIM) is a word-formation device used to express such meanings. A double diminutive is a diminutive form with two diminutive suffixes rather than one.

== Purpose ==
Diminutives are often employed as nicknames and pet names when speaking to small children and when expressing extreme tenderness and intimacy to an adult. The opposite of the diminutive form is the augmentative.

In some contexts, diminutives are also employed in a pejorative sense to denote that someone or something is weak or childish. For example, one of the last Western Roman emperors was Romulus Augustus, but his name was diminutivized to "Romulus Augustulus" to express his powerlessness.

== Formation ==
In many languages, diminutives are word forms that are formed from the root word by affixation. In most languages, diminutives can also be formed as multi-word constructions such as "Tiny Tim", or "Little Dorrit".

In English, diminutive forms can be created using the prefix mini- (minibus) or suffixes like -let (piglet) and -y (kitty, derived from kitten). Diminutives are used in personal names and shortened forms of names to convey familiarity or affection (Stevie or Stevey, derived from Steven). The suffix -y can signal approximation rather than literal smallness (a bluey color meaning somewhat blue).

In English, which is an analytic language, diminution is expressed less frequently through morphological modification and more often through descriptive phrases. Instead of attaching diminutive affixes, English commonly conveys smallness or endearment syntactically, using adjectives such as small or little (small house, little girl). By contrast, some languages that are also generally classified as analytic display far more developed diminutive morphology. For example, Macedonian has an extensive system of diminutive affixes for nouns and adjectives, comparable to those found in other South Slavic languages such as Croatian, although both languages can also express diminution through analytic constructions.

In most languages that form diminutives by affixation, this is a productive part of the language. For example, in Spanish gordo can be a nickname for someone who is overweight, and by adding an -ito suffix, it becomes gordito which is more affectionate. Examples for a double diminutive having two diminutive suffixes are in Polish dzwon → dzwonek → dzwoneczek or Italian casa → casetta → casettina).

In English, the alteration of meaning is often conveyed through clipping, making the words shorter and more colloquial. Diminutives formed by adding affixes in other languages are often longer and (as colloquial) not necessarily understood. In Australian and New Zealand English, diminutives are often formed through clipping and the addition of the suffix -o, pronounced [əṷ] - hospo from hospitality, for example.

While many languages apply a grammatical diminutive to nouns, a few – including Slovak, Dutch, Spanish, Romanian, Latin, Polish, Bulgarian, Czech, Russian and Estonian – also use it for adjectives (in Polish: słodki → słodziutki → słodziuteńki) and even other parts of speech (Ukrainian спати → спатки → спатоньки — to sleep or Slovak spať → spinkať → spinuškať — to sleep, bežať → bežkať — to run).

Diminutives in isolating languages may grammaticalize strategies other than suffixes or prefixes. In Mandarin Chinese, for example, other than the nominal prefix 小- xiǎo- and nominal suffixes -儿/-兒 -r and -子 -zi, reduplication is a productive strategy, e.g., 舅 → 舅舅 and 看 → 看看. In formal Mandarin usage, the use of diminutives is relatively infrequent, as they tend to be considered to be rather colloquial than formal. Some Wu Chinese dialects use a tonal affix for nominal diminutives; that is, diminutives are formed by changing the tone of the word.

== English examples ==
- Charlie from Charles
- darling from dear
- duckling or duckie from duck
- cygnet from Old French cigne; French cygne (both: 'swan')
- kitten from Middle English kitoun, Old French chitoun, diminutive of chat, 'cat'
- ringlet from 'ring'
- doggie from 'dog'
- fishie from 'fish'
- blankie from 'blanket'

== See also ==
- Affect (linguistics)
- Augmentative
- Comparison (grammar)
- Diminutives in Australian English
- Hypocorism (diminutives of given names)
- List of diminutives by language
- -ie ending
