= Splice =

A splice or splicing may refer to:

== Connections ==
- Rope splicing, joining two pieces of rope or cable by weaving the strands of each into the other
  - Eye splice, a method of creating a permanent loop in the end of multi stranded rope by means of rope splicing
- Splice joint, a method of joining two members end to end in woodworking
- Tape splice, the joining of audio tape
- Film splice, the joining of film stock
- Media splicing, the joining and editing of media
- Electrical splice, the joining of wires in electrical wiring
- Optical splice, the joining of optical fibers:
  - Fusion splicing, a permanent splice between two fibers
  - Mechanical splice, a temporary splice between two fibers
- Pile splice, connecting two concrete, timber or steel piles for a deep foundation
- Line splice, a splice of two cables in the telecommunication industry

== Genetics ==
- RNA splicing, a natural modification of ribonucleic acids
- Genetic engineering, also known as gene splicing, artificially joining pieces of genetic material
- Protein splicing, a natural process where inteins are removed

== Computer science ==
- Splice (system call), a system call used to transfer data on Linux
- Delayed binding, also called TCP connection splicing, is a postponement of the connection between the client and the server in computer networking
- An operation between two linked lists, in which all or part of one list is transferred to another in constant time by relinking
- An operation on arrays in programming languages like JavaScript, PHP or Python

== Mathematics ==
- Splicing rule, a transformation of formal languages
- Splicing of knots creates satellite knots

== Media ==
- Splice (film), a 2009 science fiction film
- Spliced (TV series), a 2010 Canadian animated TV series
- Splice (video game), a 2012 puzzle game

== Other uses ==
- Software release life cycle, or Software Product Life Cycle (SPLICE)
- Splice (platform), a cloud-based music creation and collaboration platform
- Splice the mainbrace, an order given aboard naval vessels to issue the crew with a drink
- Splicing veins, the connection of more than one vein to formulate a long vein conduit for vascular bypass surgery
- Splice, on a cricket bat, where the handle is joined to the body of the bat
