= Nyfors =

Swedish supplier of optical fiber handling equipment

Nyfors Teknologi AB
- Company type: Private
- Industry: Fusion splicing
- Founded: Sweden, Stockholm (1987)
- Headquarters: Stockholm
- Key people: Uwe Böttcher (Founder)
- Products: Fusion splicing equipment
- Website: www.nyfors.com

Nyfors Teknologi AB is a high-end supplier of advanced optical fiber handling equipment, based in Stockholm, Sweden. The company develops and manufactures equipment used in optical fiber fusion splicing, including products for stripping and preparation, testing and analysing and fiber end-face inspection, but is most well known for its automated optical fiber recoating and fiber cleaving systems. Nyfors products are sold internationally to customers within a wide range of industrial sectors and to public and private research institutions.

The company has its origin in the telecommunications industry and was founded in 1987 by Uwe Böttcher, the former head of Fusion Splicing Development and Production at LM Ericsson Fiber Optics in Stockholm. Nyfors first commercial product was an optical fiber recoater launched in 1988.

== Recoating ==
Optical fiber recoating is the process of restoring the primary coating to stripped optical fiber sections after fusion splicing. The polymer comprising the recoat is usually similar in composition to the original fiber polymer coating. Nyfors optical fiber recoaters are designed to restore the primary coating on spliced optical fibers with acrylate coatings. Due to the mould design, the restored part of the coating has a diameter and other properties, such as eccentricity and roundness, that are almost identical to the original fiber.

One of the first major projects in which Nyfors participated was the submarine optical fiber cable between the Swedish mainland and Gotland in the Baltic Sea. The project was carried out in close collaboration between Alcatel and the public telephone company Televerket, with Nyfors providing the on-board optical fiber recoaters. Partly as a result of the technological development carried out during this project, the company was able to launch its first commercial optical fiber recoater in 1988.

== See also ==
- List of Swedish companies
- Recoating
- Stripping (fiber)
- Fusion splicing
- Optical communication
- Optical fiber
- Cleave (fiber)
- Fiber-optic communication
