= Knob-and-tube wiring =

Type of electrical wiring

Technical Overview
- Active years: 1880s–1940s (restricted/obsolescent by 1950s)
- Components: Porcelain knobs, porcelain tubes, single-conductor copper wire, loom (protective sleeve)
- Insulation: Rubberized cloth, cotton asphalt-saturated sleeve
- Voltage typical: 120 V AC

Safety & Compatibility
- Grounding: None (Two-wire system)
- Overcurrent protection: Typically 15-amp fuses
- Thermal insulation risk: High (cannot be covered by building insulation)
- Current status: Permitted for extension in existing installations (NEC), but widely considered obsolete and a fire hazard

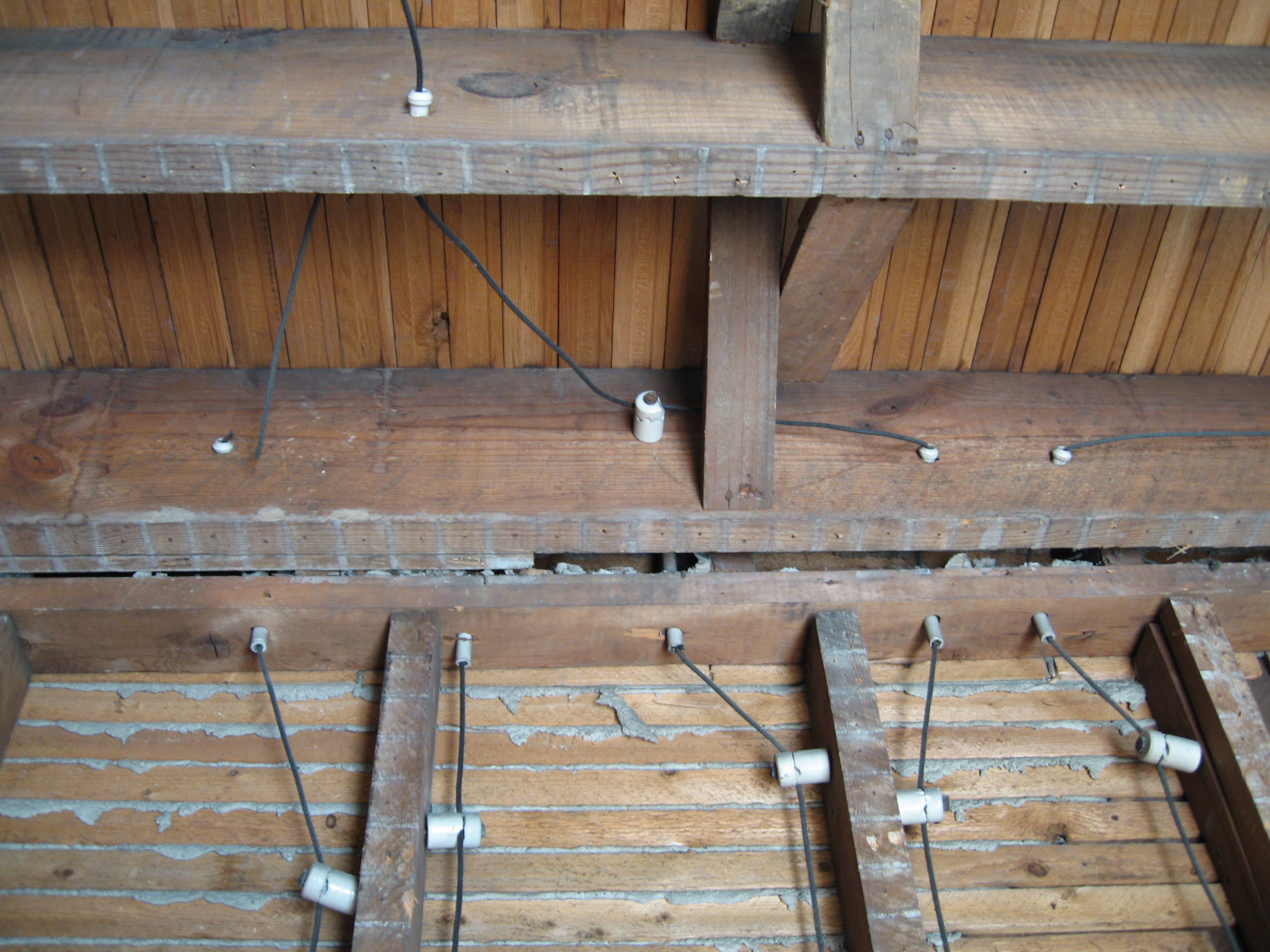
Knob-and-tube wiring in a 1930 home. View looking upwards at upper wall stud bays and nearby ceiling joists.

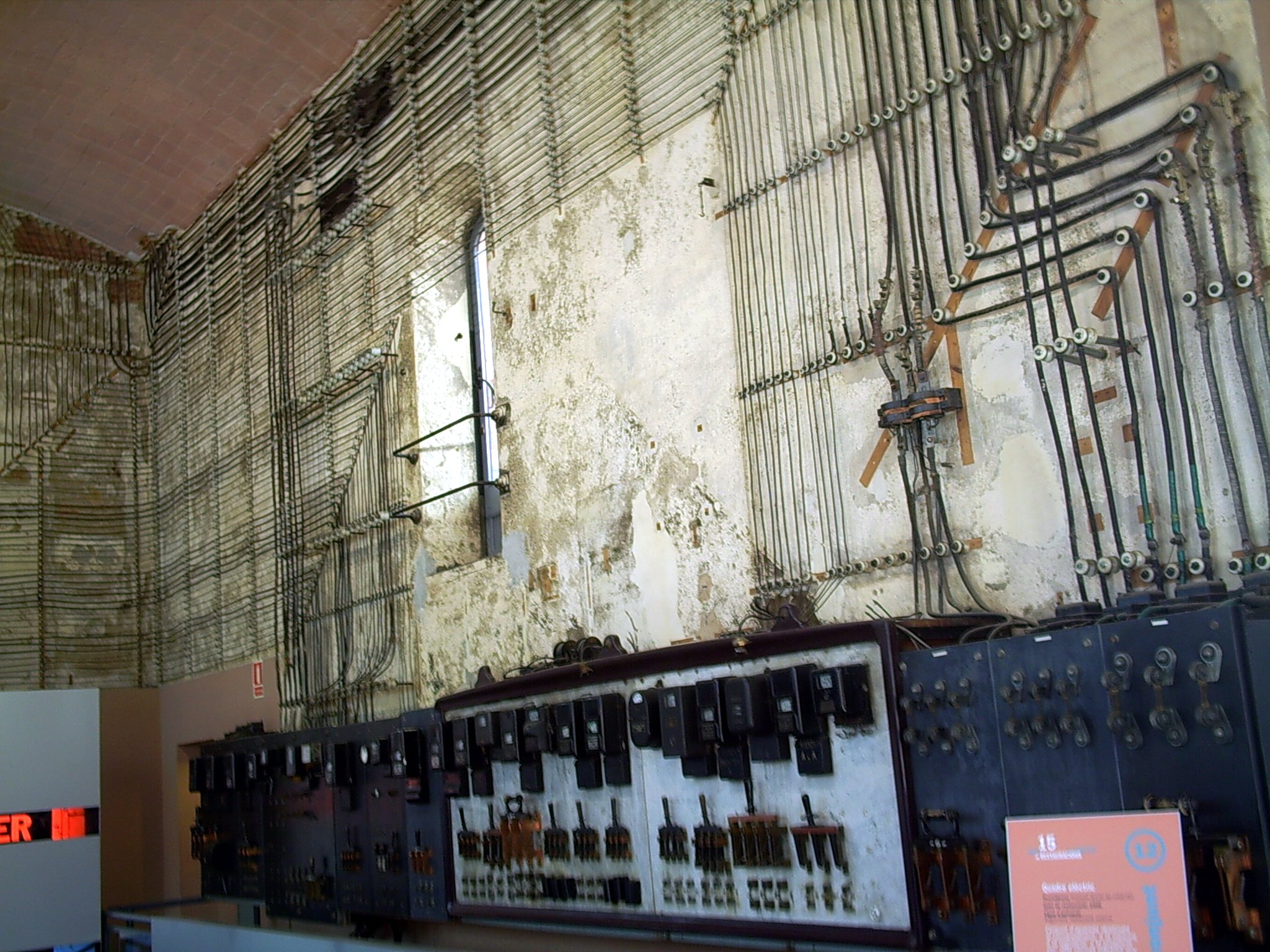
Knob-and-tube wiring used in a textile factory

Knob-and-tube wiring (K&T wiring) is an early standardized method of electrical wiring in buildings. It was common in North America and Japan starting in the 1880s, remaining prevalent until the 1940s in North America and the early 1960s in Japan.

It consisted of single-insulated copper conductors run within wall or ceiling cavities, passing through joist and stud drill-holes via protective porcelain insulating tubes, and supported along their length on nailed-down porcelain knob insulators. Where conductors entered a wiring device such as a lamp or switch, or were pulled into a wall, they were protected by flexible cloth insulating sleeving called loom. The first insulation was asphalt-saturated cotton cloth, then rubber became common. Wire splices in such installations were twisted together for good mechanical strength, then soldered and wrapped with rubber insulating tape and friction tape (asphalt saturated cloth), or made inside metal junction boxes.

Knob-and-tube wiring was eventually displaced from interior wiring systems because of the high cost of installation compared with use of power cables, which combined both power conductors of a circuit in one run (and which later included grounding conductors). Also, the cloth insulation is considered a fire hazard as it eventually dries out and crumbles.

At present, new concealed knob-and-tube installations are allowed in the U.S. only by special permission.

== Elements ==
Ceramic knobs were cylindrical and generally nailed directly into the wall studs or floor joists. Most had a circular groove running around their circumference, although some were constructed in two pieces with pass-through grooves on each side of the nail in the middle. A leather washer often cushioned the ceramic, to reduce breakage during installation.

By wrapping electrical wires around the knob, and securing them with tie wires, the knob could be used to securely and permanently anchor the wire. The knobs separated the wire from potentially combustible framework, facilitated changes in direction, and ensured that wires were not subject to excessive tension. Because the wires were suspended in air, they could dissipate heat well.

Ceramic tubes were inserted into holes bored in wall studs or floor joists, and the wires were directed through them. This kept the wires from coming into contact with the wood framing members and from being compressed by the wood as the house settled. Ceramic tubes were sometimes also used when wires crossed over each other, for protection in case the upper wire were to break and fall on the lower conductor.

Ceramic cleats, which were block-shaped pieces, had channels for wires to pass through them, and were generally used in places where the wiring was surface mounted, such as along a wall or ceiling. Not all knob and tube installations utilized cleats.

Ceramic bushings protected each wire entering a metal device box, when such an enclosure was used.

Loom, a woven flexible insulating sleeve, was slipped over insulated wire to provide additional protection whenever a wire passed over or under another wire, when a wire entered a metal device enclosure, and in other situations prescribed by code.

Other ceramic pieces would typically be used as a junction point between the wiring system proper, and the more flexible cloth-clad wiring found in light fixtures or other permanent, hard-wired devices. When a generic power outlet was desired, the wiring could run directly into the junction box through a tube of protective loom and a ceramic bushing.

Wiring devices such as light switches, receptacle outlets, and lamp sockets were either surface-mounted, suspended, or flush-mounted within walls and ceilings. Only in the last case were metal boxes always used to enclose the wiring and device.

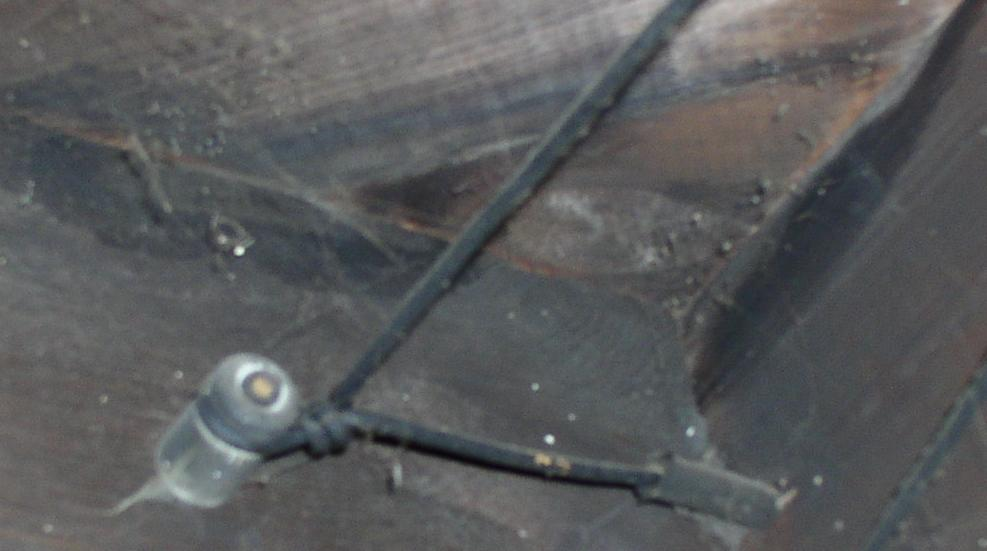
Knob supporting a wire change in direction

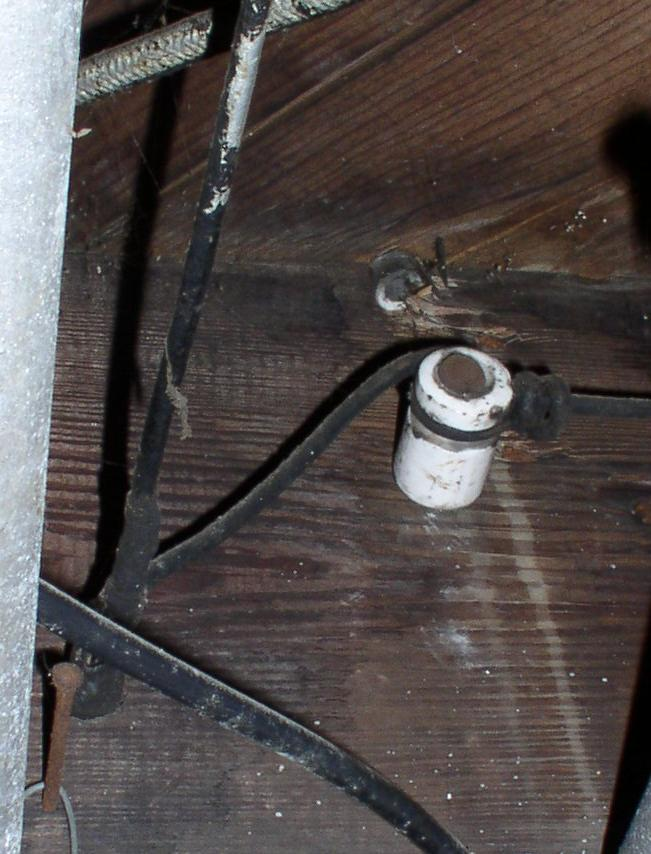
Knob supporting a splice

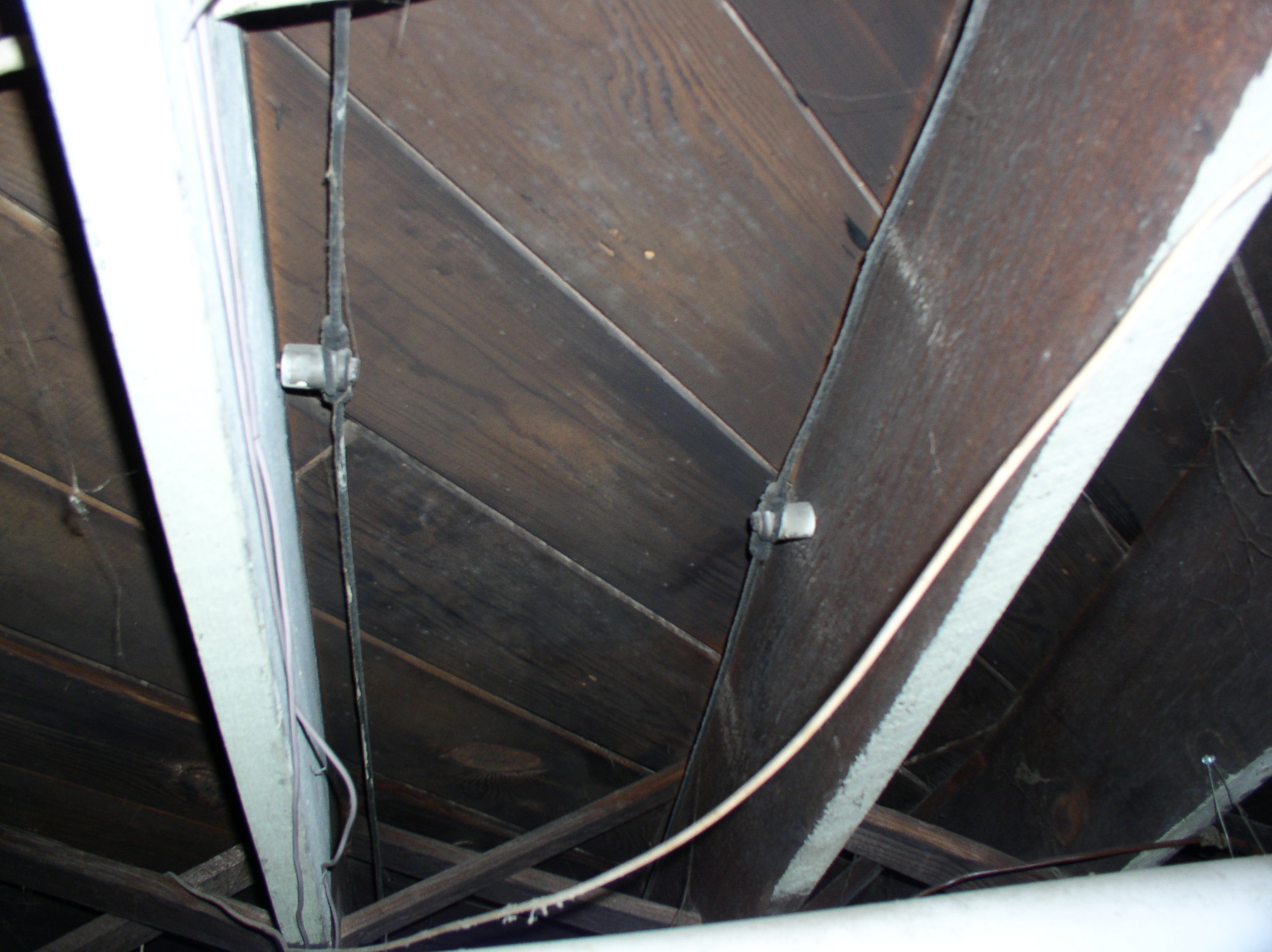
Knobs supporting long runs of wire

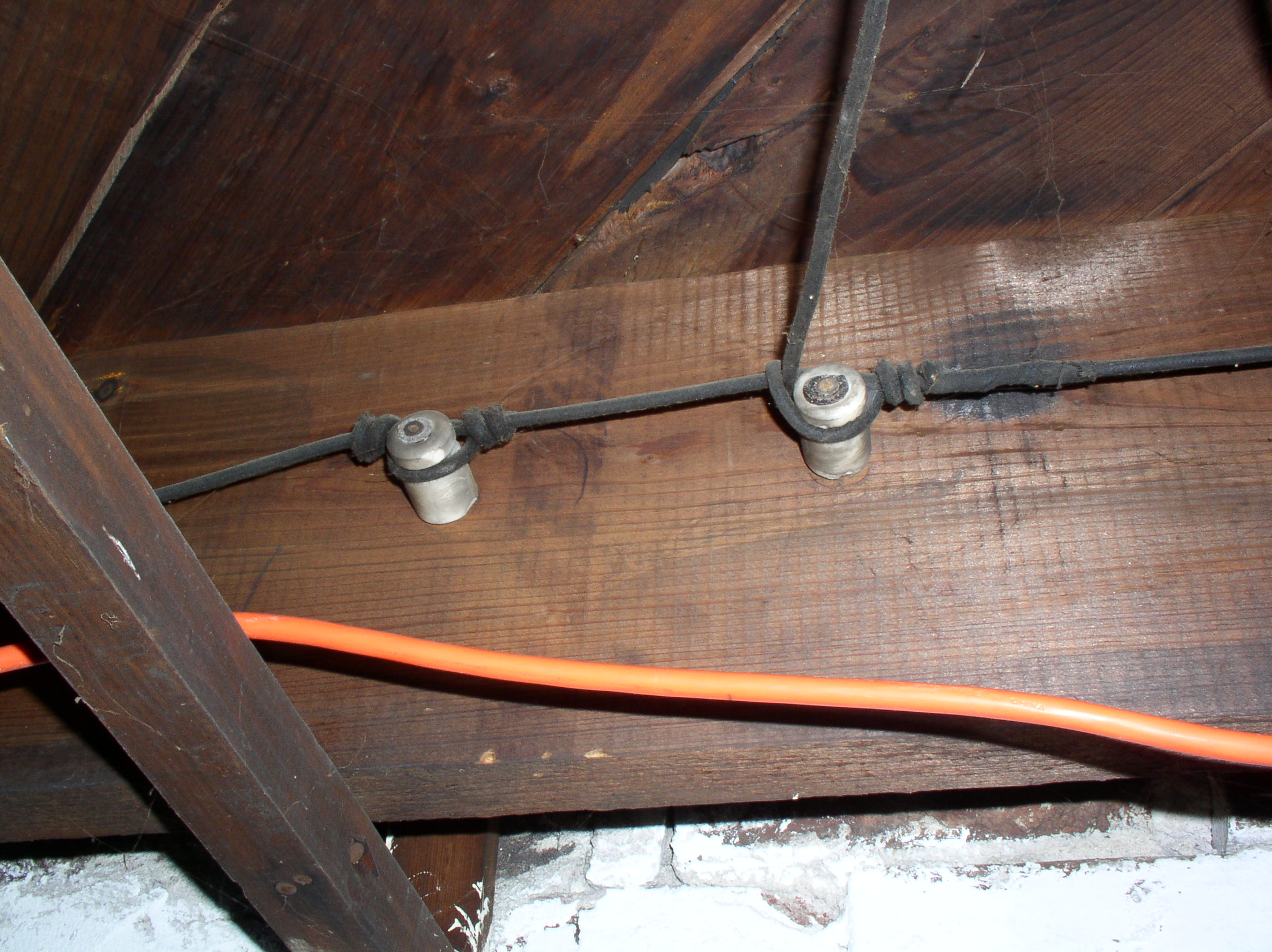
Knobs serving multiple functions

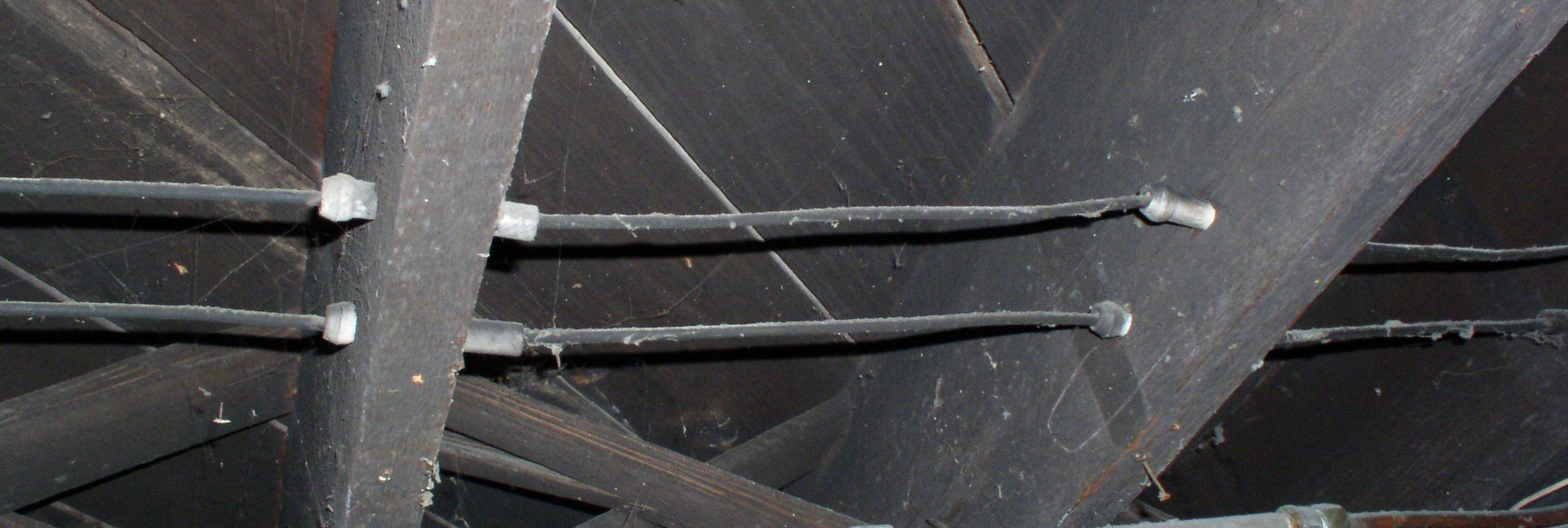
Ceramic tubes protecting wires passing through ceiling joists

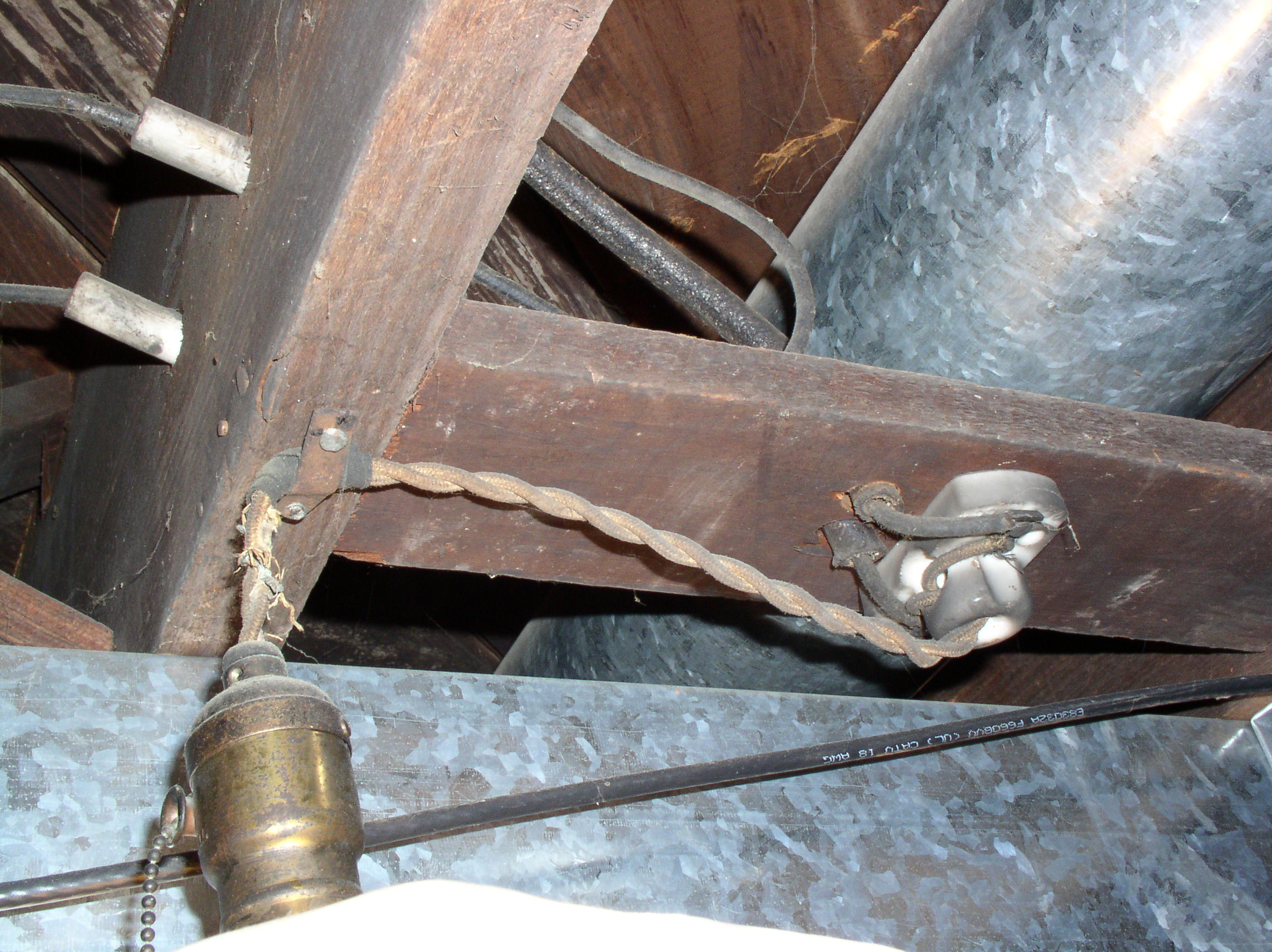
Ceramic junction for suspended light socket. Note deteriorated cloth insulation.

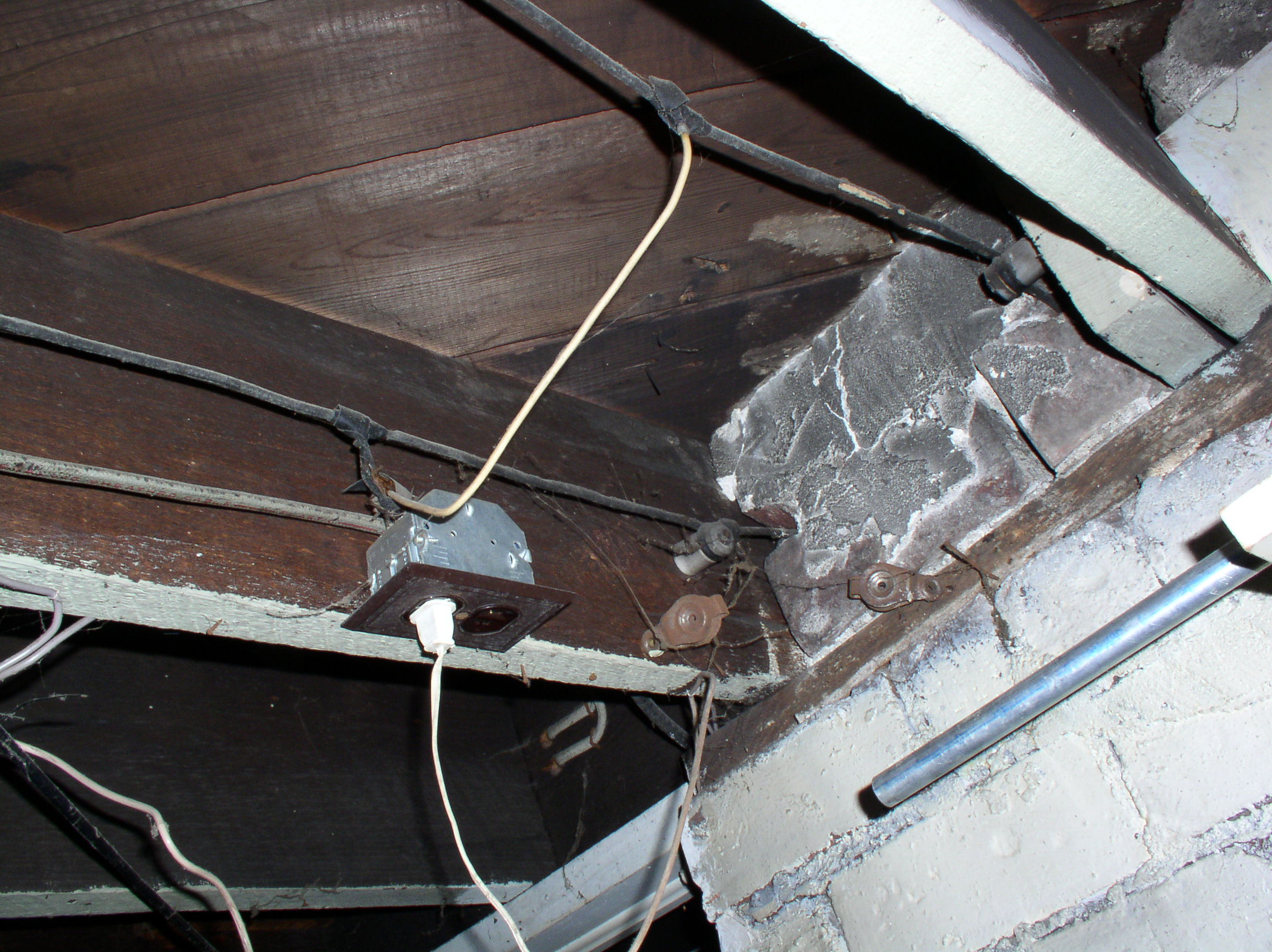
Splice with more modern power outlet, a probable code violation as seen here

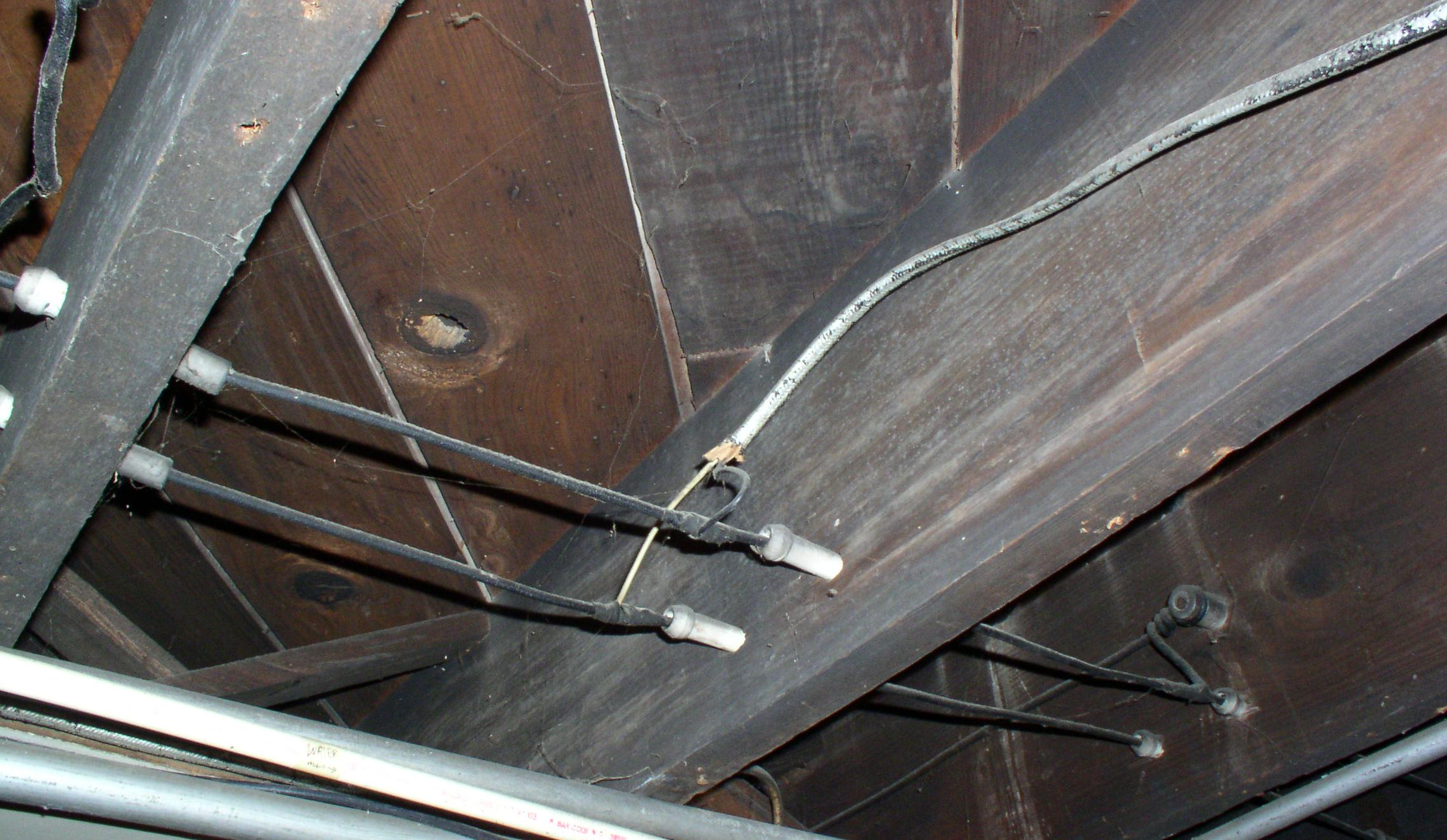
Wiring running through tubes, and turning a corner supported by a knob. Notice the direct splice with more modern (1950s-era) non-metallic–sheathed cable. This type of connection is forbidden by the National Electrical Code, and a junction box should have been used.

== Unusual wiring layouts ==
In many older K&T installations, the supply and return wires were routed separately from each other, rather than being located parallel to and near each other. This direct routing method has the advantage of reduced cost by allowing use of the shortest possible lengths of wire, but the major disadvantage is that a detailed building wiring diagram is needed for other electricians to understand multiple interwoven circuits, especially if the wiring is not fully visible throughout its length. By contrast, modern electrical codes now require that all residential wiring connections be made only inside protective enclosures, such as junction boxes, and that all connections must remain accessible for inspection, troubleshooting, repair, or modification.

Under the US electrical code, Carter system wiring layouts have now been banned, even for permissible new installations of K&T wiring. However, electricians must be aware of this older system, which is still present in many existing older electrical installations.

== Neutral fusing ==
Another practice that was common (or even originally required) in some older K&T designs was the installation of separate fuses in both the hot wire and the neutral (return) wire of an electrical circuit. The failure of a neutral fuse would cut off power flow through the affected circuit, but the hot conductor could still remain hot relative to ground, an unexpected and potentially hazardous situation. Because of the presence of a neutral fuse, and in the event that it blew, the neutral conductor could not be relied on to remain near ground potential; and, in fact, could be at full line potential (via transmission of voltage through a switched-on light bulb, for example).

Modern electrical codes generally do not require a neutral fuse. Instead, they explicitly forbid configurations that might break continuity of the neutral conductor, unless all associated hot conductors are also simultaneously disconnected (for example, by using ganged or "tied" circuit breakers). In retrofit situations electricians may place a higher value fuse on the neutral, so that fuse blows last.

== Advantages ==
In the early 1900s, K&T wiring was less expensive to install than other wiring methods. For several decades, electricians could choose between K&T wiring, conduit, armored cable, and metal junction boxes. The conduit methods were known to be of better quality, but cost significantly more than K&T. In 1909, flexible armored cable cost about twice as much as K&T, and conduit cost about three times the price of K&T. Knob-and-tube wiring persisted since it allowed owners to wire a building for electricity at lower cost.

Modern wiring methods assume that two or more load-carrying conductors will lie very near each other, as for instance in standard NM-2 cable. When installed correctly, the K&T wires are held away from the structural materials by ceramic insulators.

Over the K&T era multiple wire types evolved. Early wiring was insulated with cotton cloth and soft rubber, while later wiring was much more robust. Although the actual wire covering may have degraded over the decades, the porcelain standoffs have a nearly unlimited lifespan and will keep any bare wires safely insulated. Today, porcelain standoffs are still commonly used with bare-wire electric fencing for livestock, and such porcelain standoffs carry far higher voltage surges without risk of shorting to ground.

In summary, K&T wiring that was installed correctly, and not damaged or incorrectly modified since then, is fairly safe when used within the original current-carrying limits, typically about ten amperes per circuit.

== Disadvantages ==
Historically, wiring installation requirements were less demanding in the age of knob-and-tube wiring than today. Compared to modern electrical wiring standards, these are the main technical shortcomings of knob-and-tube wiring methods:

- did not include a safety grounding conductor
- did not confine switching to the hot conductor (the so-called Carter system prohibited as of 1923 places electrical loads across the common terminals of a three-way switch pair)
- permitted the use of in-line splices in walls without a junction box (however, this downside is offset by the strong nature of the soldered and taped junctions used at the time).
- susceptible to mechanical damage in accessible areas

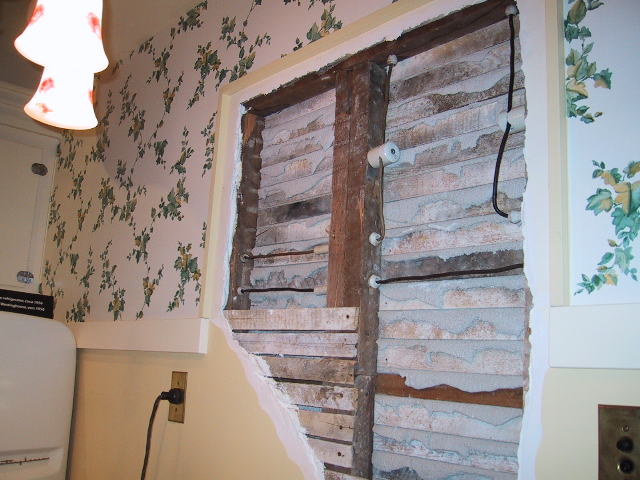
Knob-and-tube wiring at a Manitoba Electrical Museum display

Over time, the price of electrician labor grew faster than the cost of materials. This removed the price advantage of K&T methods, especially since they required time-consuming skillful soldering of in-line splices and junctions, and careful hand-wrapping of connections in layers of insulating tape.

Knob-and-tube wiring can be made with high current carrying capacity. However, most existing residential knob-and-tube installations, dating to before 1940, have fewer branch circuits than is desired today. While these installations were adequate for the electrical loads at the time of installation, modern households use a range and intensity of electrical equipment unforeseen at the time. Household power use increased dramatically following World War II, due to the wide availability of new electrical appliances and devices.

Modern home buyers often find that existing K&T systems lack the capacity for today's levels of power use. First-generation wiring systems became susceptible to abuse by homeowners who would replace blown fuses with fuses rated for higher current. This overfusing of the circuits subjects wiring to higher levels of current and risks heat damage or fire.

Knob-and-tube wiring may also be damaged by building renovations. Its cloth and rubber insulation can dry out and turn brittle. It may also be damaged by rodents and careless activities such as hanging objects from wiring running in accessible areas like basements or attics.

Currently, the United States National Electrical Code forbids the use of loose, blown-in, or expanding foam insulation over K&T wiring. This is because K&T is designed to let heat dissipate to the surrounding air. As a result, energy efficiency upgrades that involve insulating previously uninsulated walls usually also require replacement of the wiring in affected homes. However, California, Washington, Nebraska, and Oregon have modified the NEC to conditionally allow insulation around K&T. They did not find a single fire that was attributed to K&T, and permit insulation provided the home first passes inspection by an electrician.

As existing K&T wiring gets older, insurance companies may deny coverage due to a perception of increased risk. Several companies will not write new homeowners policies at all unless all K&T wiring is replaced, or an electrician certifies that the wiring is in good condition. Also, many institutional lenders are unwilling to finance a home with the relatively low-capacity service typical of K&T wiring, unless the electrical service is upgraded. Partial upgrades, where low demand lighting circuits are left intact, may be acceptable to some insurers.

== Usage in Japan ==
Although knob-and-tube wiring was not widespread outside of North America, Japan was a notable exception. In Japan, knob-and-tube Wiring, known as Gaishi-biki kōji (碍子引き工事), became widespread following the introduction of large-scale alternating current (AC) power transmission in 1889 and remained common in residential buildings until the early 1960s.

Japan’s predominance of wood-framed housing, similar to the United States, combined with rapid modernization and the import of electrical technologies from the United States, made K&T wiring a practical solution for early electrical installations. A significant difference between North America and Japan was that knob-and-tube wiring in Japan was generally not allowed in concealed locations, such as behind walls. If concealed, the wiring had to remain accessible through inspection panels to facilitate inspections.

Although the United States largely abandoned knob-and-tube wiring in the 1930s, Japan continued to use it into the 1960s. Japan’s shift away from knob-and-tube wiring was triggered by exposure to American wiring methods after World War II, particularly following a 1956 Japanese delegation’s visit to the United States, where they observed more efficient wiring using NM cable, also known by its brand name Romex. By the late 1950s, Japanese installations were rapidly transitioning to plastic-sheathed cables laid across ceilings or crawlspaces, and these developments led to the creation and 1964 standardization of the VVF cable, Japan’s equivalent to North America’s NM cable.

== See also ==
- Rat-tail splice
- T-splice
- Western Union splice
