= Rope splicing =

Semi-permanent joint between two ropes

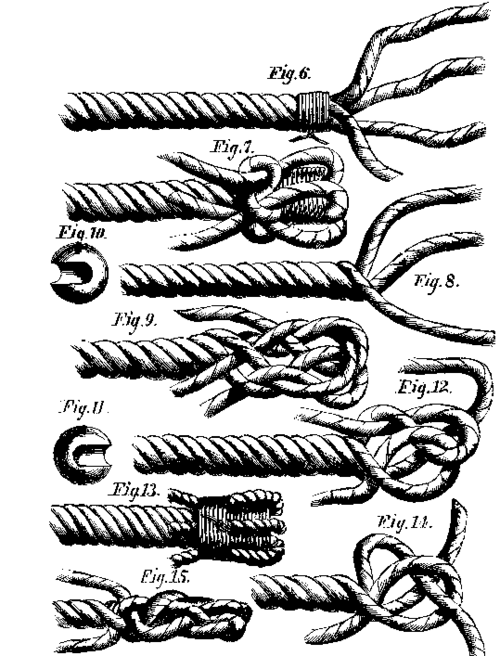
Stages in splicing the end of a rope, from Scientific American, 1871

Rope splicing in ropework is the forming of a semi-permanent joint between two ropes or two parts of the same rope by partly untwisting and then interweaving their strands. Splices can be used to form a stopper at the end of a line, to form a loop or an eye in a rope, or for joining two ropes together. Splices are preferred to knotted rope, since while a knot typically reduces the strength by 20–40%, a splice is capable of attaining a rope's full strength. However, splicing usually results in a thickening of the line and, if subsequently removed, leaves a distortion of the rope. Most types of splices are used on three-strand rope, but some can be done on 12-strand or greater single-braided rope, as well as most double braids.

While a spliced three-strand rope's strands are interwoven to create the splice, a braided rope's splice is constructed by simply pulling the rope into its jacket.

== Types of splice ==
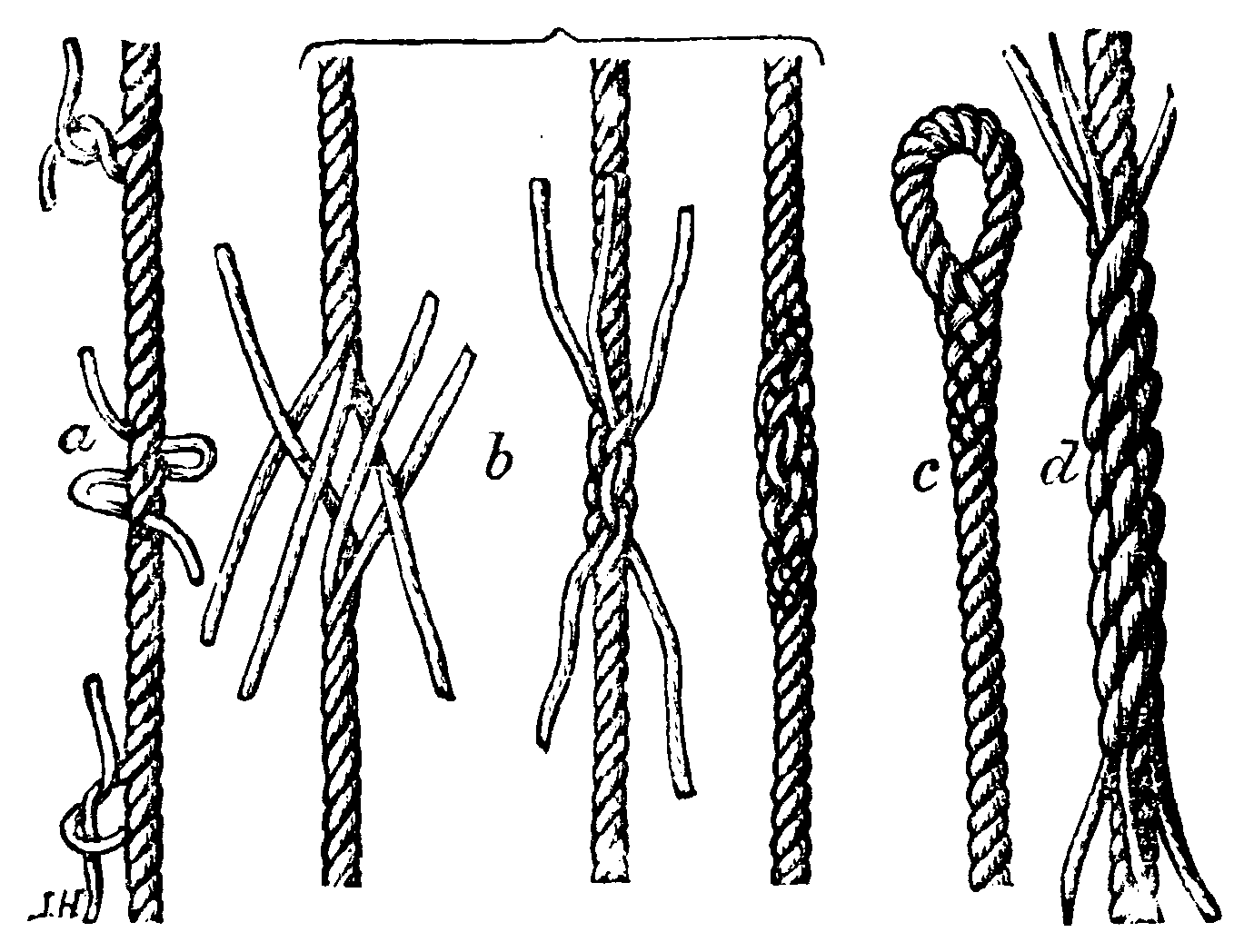
Examples of splices in different stages of completion, from the Nordisk familjebok: a) long splice b) tapered short splice c) eye splice d) short splice

- Back splice (or end splice) – A splice where the strands of the end of the rope are spliced directly back into the end without forming a loop. It is used to finish off the end of the rope to keep it from fraying. The end of the rope with the splice is about twice the thickness of the rest of the rope. With nylon and other plastic materials, the back splice is often no longer used; the rope strands are simply fused together with heat to prevent fraying.
  An unfinished cut splice
- Cut splice (originally cunt splice) – A splice similar to the eye splice. It is typically used for light lines (e.g. the log-line) where a single splice would tend to come undone, the rope being frequently wet. It makes a very strong knot. A cut splice is a join between two ropes, made by side splicing the ends slightly apart, to make an eye in the joined rope which lies shut when the rope is taut. Its original name was bowdlerised to "cut splice".
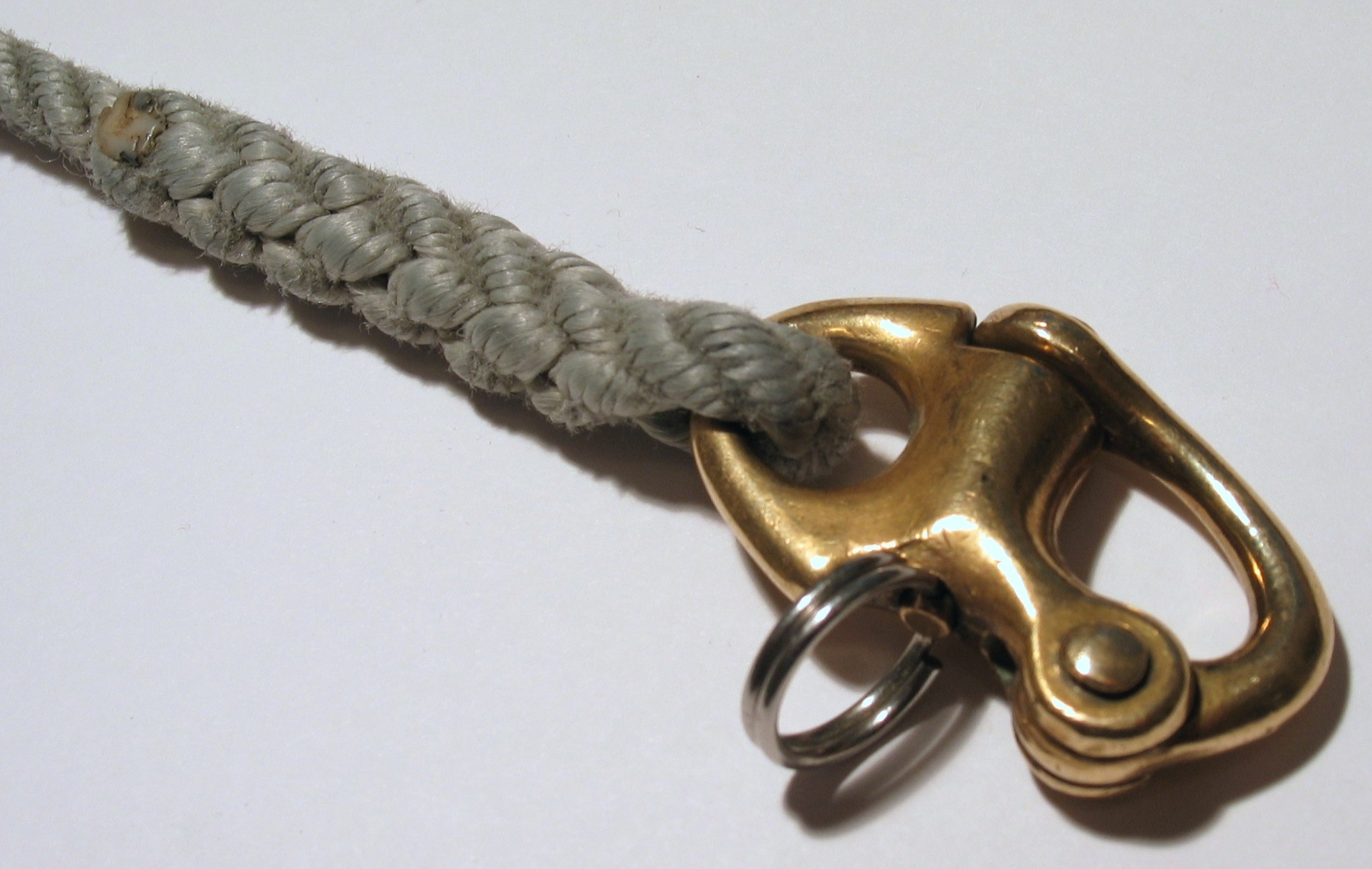
  A line eye-spliced to a snap shackle
- Eye splice – A splice where the working end is spliced into the working part forming a loop.
- Ring splice – Attached the working end of a rope to a ring or clew.
- Chain splice – Attached the working end of a rope to a chain.
- Figure-eight "splice" knot – A splice-like bend knot used for joining two ropes.
- Horseshoe splice – A cut splice where the two sides of the loop are of unequal length.
- Long splice – A splice used to join two rope ends forming one rope the length of the total of the two ropes. The long splice, unlike most splice types, results in a splice that is only very slightly thicker than the rope without the splice, but sacrifices some of the strength of the short splice. It does this by replacing two of the strands of each rope end with those from the other, and cutting off some of the extra strands that result. The long splice allows the spliced rope to still fit through the same pulleys, which is necessary in some applications.
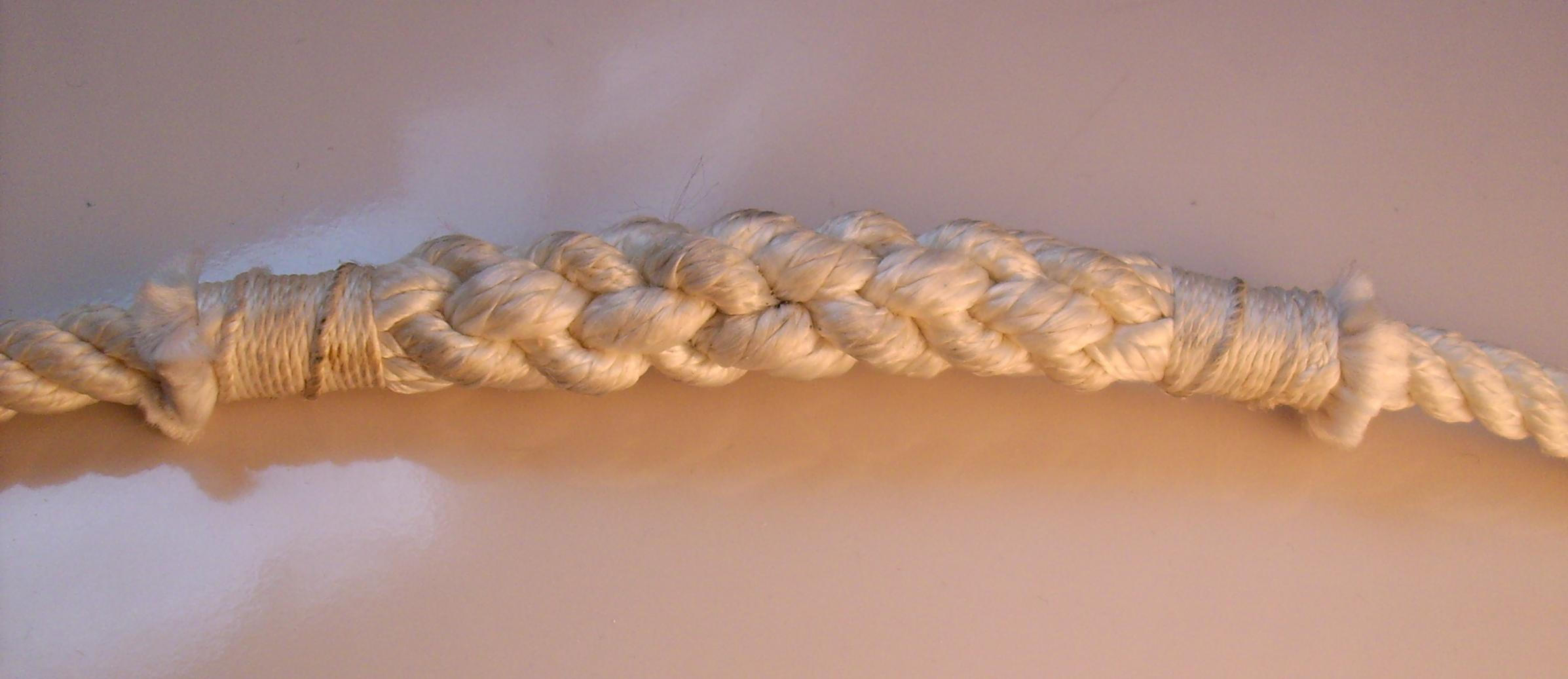
  A short splice, with ends whipped
- Short splice – Also a splice used to join the ends of two ropes, but the short splice is more similar to the technique used in other splices and results in the spliced part being about twice as thick as the non spliced part, and has greater strength than the long splice. The short splice retains more of the rope strength than any knots that join rope ends.

Splices are often tapered to make the thicker splice blend into the rest of the line. There are two main types of tapering, the standard and the "West Coast Taper".

- Standard tapers progressively remove a portion of each remaining strand – one-third at a time is typical, resulting in a taper of two additional tucks beyond the splice – thus making each successive tuck produce a narrower splice. This is only practical with laid-lines – those made up of numerous strands laid side by side.
- West Coast taper (or Fisherman's taper) is effected by extra-tucks of entire strands, such that the second strand is woven one more time than the first and the third is woven an additional time after the second.

== Splicing tools ==
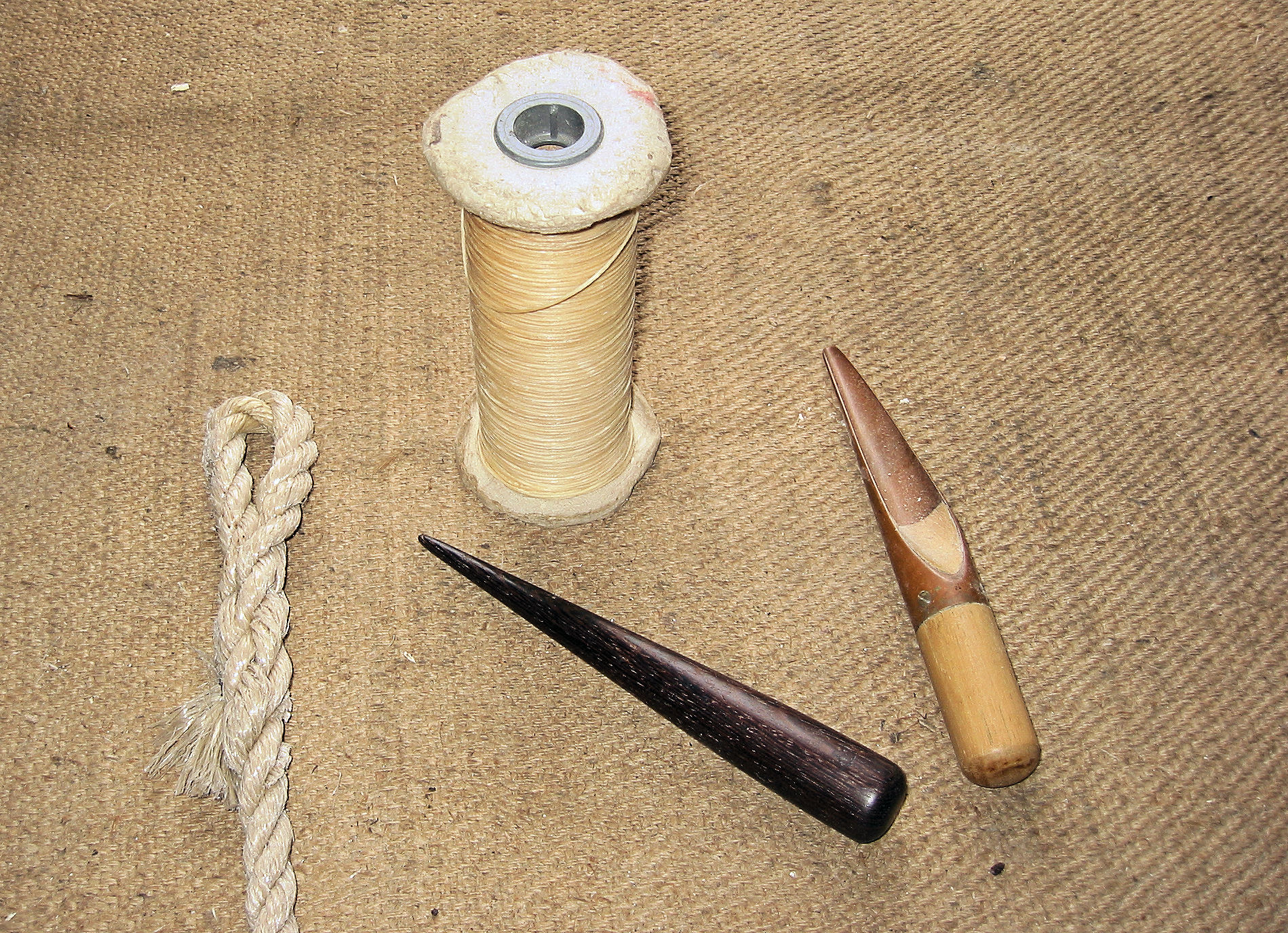
Eye splice, common whipping thread, fid and Swedish fid

A fid is a hand tool made from wood, plastic, or bone and is used in the process of working with rope. A variety of fid diameters are available depending on the size of rope being used. Styles of fid designs include:

- A Swedish fid is conical instrument with a somewhat long taper.
- Tubular fids aid in splicing double-braided rope.
- Top fids are used to pull rope taut while separating strands of rope with a Swedish fid.
- Uni-fids are needed to splice braid with a parallel core.

A marlinspike is a tool, usually made of steel and often part of a sailor's pocketknife, which is used to separate strands of rope from one another. They can range in size anywhere from 3 inches (76 mm) to 5 feet (1.5 m) long, with a round or flattened point.

A pulling fid is often used for smaller diameters of braided ropes. Also a Softfid is a great tool when dealing with tightly braided ropes.

== See also ==
- Eye splice – Method of creating a loop in the end of a rope
- Fid – Ropework tool
- Rat-tail splice – Method of joining electrical wire
- Splice the mainbrace – Order given aboard naval vessels
- Stopper knot – Knot that forms a fixed thicker point to prevent unreeving
- Swaged sleeve – Mechanically swaged connector
- T-splice – Method of joining electrical wire
- Western Union splice – Method of joining electrical cable
- Whipping knot – Binding around the end of a rope to prevent it from fraying
