= Recoating =

Fibre optic process

Recoating is the process of restoring the primary coating to stripped optical fiber sections after fusion splicing. In the recoating process, the spliced fiber is restored to its original shape and strength, using a recoater. The stripped fiber section is recoated by filling a recoating resin, usually acrylate into transparent moulds. The resin is then cured with UV light. It is often desirable to perform a proof-test after recoating, to ensure that the splice is strong enough to survive handling, packaging and extended use.

Recoated splices can usually be coiled into a tight radius because the recoated fiber section is just as flexible as the original polymer coating. Recoats are e.g. employed in the assembly of undersea optical fiber cables where high fusion splice strength is already necessitated by stringent reliability requirements. Another reason optical fiber recoating is attractive in submarine communications cabling is that the cross section of recoated fibers matches that of the original fiber.

The first commercial optical fiber recoaters were developed by the Swedish firms Nyfors Teknologi AB and LM Ericsson in the late 1980s for the telecommunications industry.

== See also ==
- Stripping (fiber)
- Optical communication
- Cleave (fiber)
- Fiber-optic communication
