= Line splice =

Joint in electrical or optical cable

In electrical engineering and telecommunications, a line splice is a joint directly connecting lengths of electrical cables (electrical splice) or optical fibers (optical splice).

The splices are often protected by sleeves.

== Splicing of copper wires ==
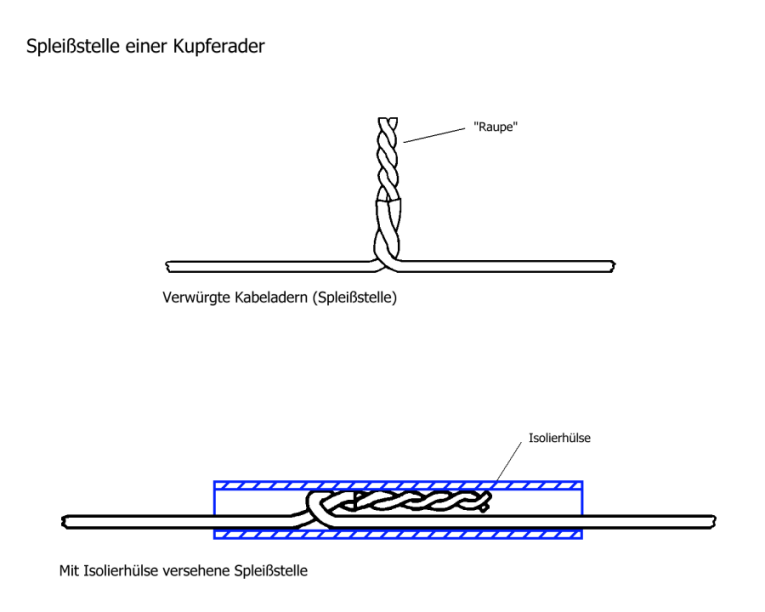
Splice site of a copper wire.

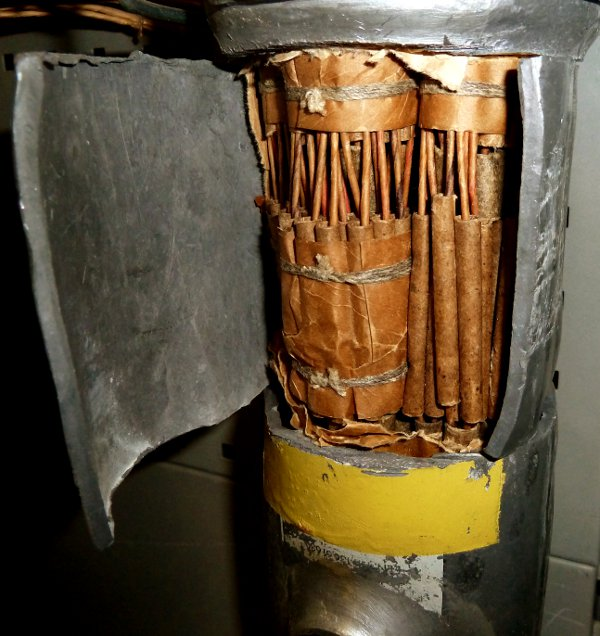
Cable sleeve (lead sleeve) for connecting paper-insulated wires

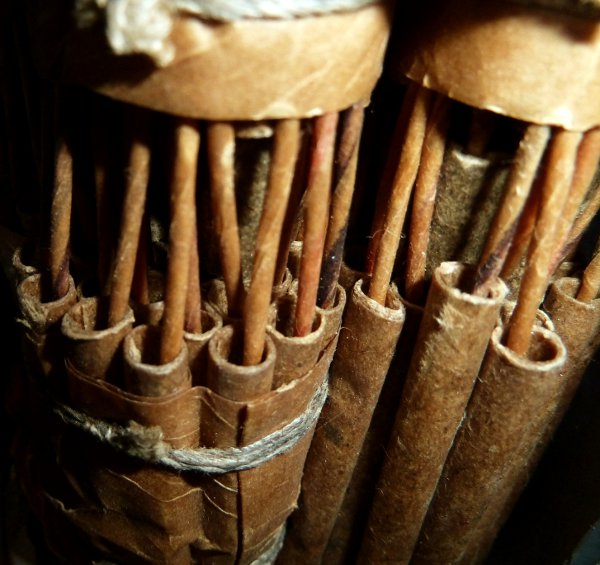
Insulating sleeves

The splicing of copper wires happens in the following steps:

- The cores are laid one above the other at the junction.
- The core insulation is removed.
- The wires are wrapped two to three times around each other (twisting).
- The bare veins on a length of about 3 cm "strangle" or "twist". In some cases, the strangulation is soldered.
- To isolate the splice, an insulating sleeve made of paper or plastic is pushed over it.

The splicing of copper wires is mainly used on paper insulated wires.

LSA techniques (LSA: soldering, screwing and stripping free) are used to connect copper wires, making the copper wires faster and easier to connect. LSA techniques include:

- Wire connection sleeves (AVH = Adernverbindungshülsen) and other crimp connectors. The two wires to be connected are inserted into the AVH without being stripped, which is then compressed with special pliers. The about 2 cm long AVH consist of contact, pressure and insulation.
- For wire connection strips (AVL = Adernverbindungsleisten) several pairs of wires (10 = AVL10 or 20 = AVL20) are inserted, the strip is then closed with a lid and pressed together with a hydraulic press, which ensures the connection.

== Splicing of glass fibers ==
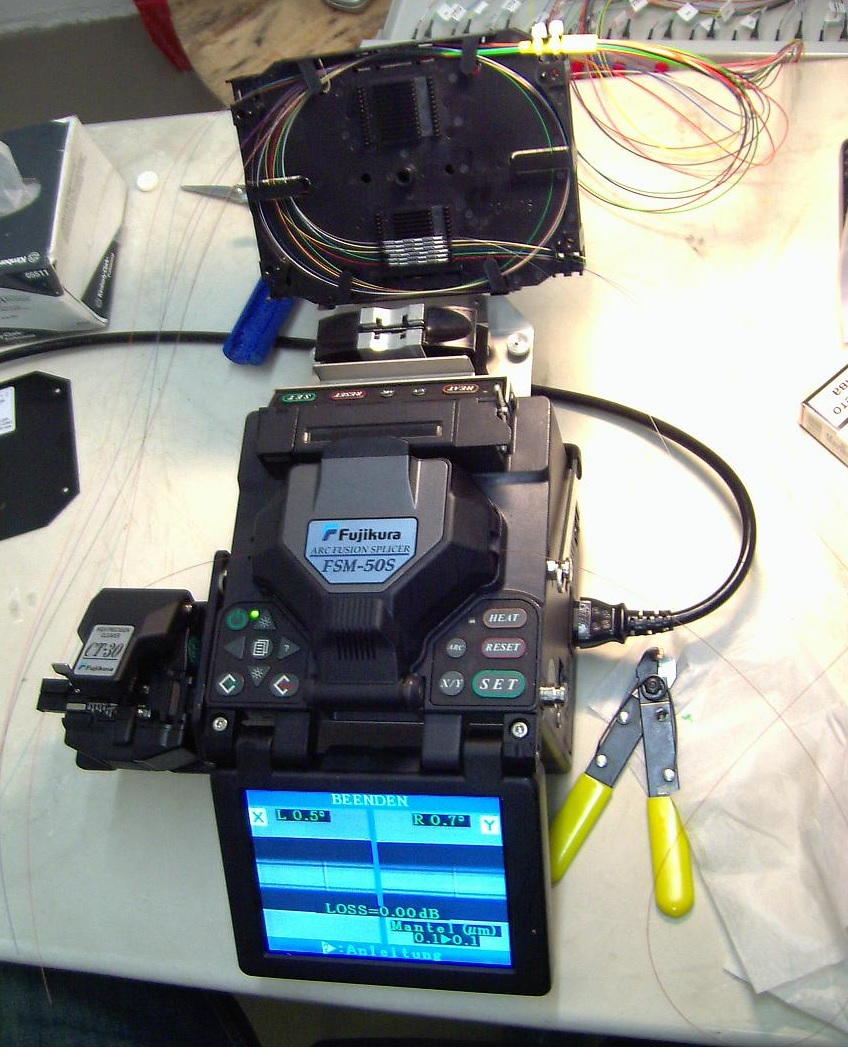
Splicing of glass fibers by thermal fusion splice. Fiber optic cable sleeve

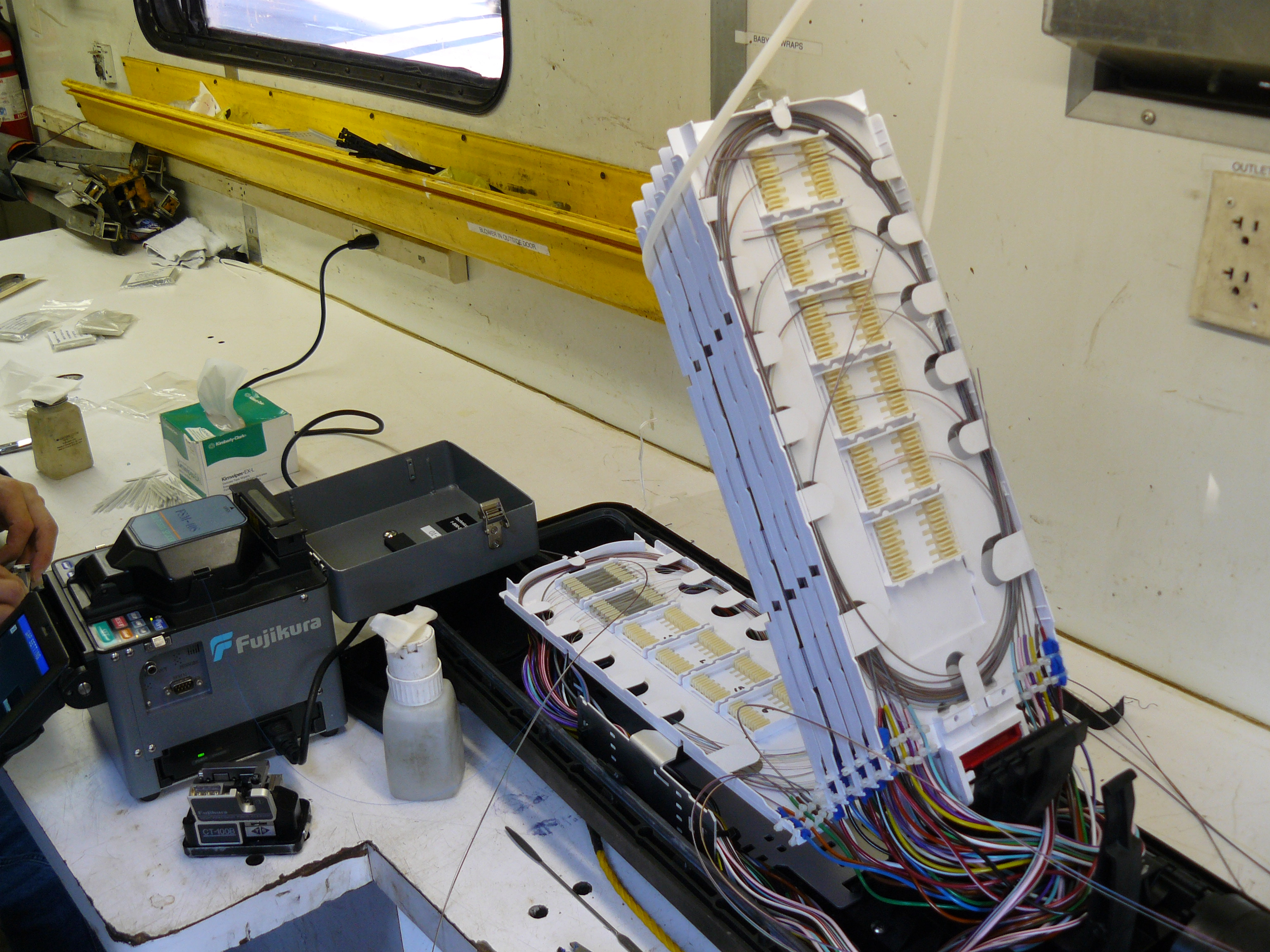
Fiber optic cable splicer

Fiber-optic cables are spliced using a special arc-splicer, with installation cables connected at their ends to respective "pigtails" - short individual fibers with fiber-optic connectors at one end. The splicer precisely adjusts the light-guiding cores of the two ends of the glass fibers to be spliced. The adjustment is done fully automatically in modern devices, whereas in older models this is carried out manually by means of micrometer screws and microscope. An experienced splicer can precisely position the fiber ends within a few seconds. Subsequently, the fibers are fused together (welded) with an electric arc. Since no additional material is added, such as gas welding or soldering, this is called a "fusion splice".

Depending on the quality of the splicing process, attenuation values at the splice points are achieved by 0.3 dB, with good splices also below 0.02 dB. For newer generation devices, alignment is done automatically by motors. Here one differentiates core and jacket centering. At core centering (usually single-mode fibers), the fiber cores are aligned. A possible core offset with respect to the jacket is corrected. In the jacket centering (usually in multimode fibers), the fibers are adjusted to each other by means of electronic image processing in front of the splice.

When working with good equipment, the damping value is according to experience at max. 0.1 dB. Measurements are made by means of special measuring devices including optical time-domain reflectometry (OTDR). A good splice should have an attenuation of less than 0.3 dB over the entire distance. Finished fiber optic splices are housed in splice boxes.

One differentiates:

- Fusion splice
- Adhesive splicing
- Crimp splice or NENP (no-epoxy no-polish), mechanical splice

== See also ==
- Fusion splicing
- Mechanical splice
- Rat-tail splice
- T-splice
- Western Union splice
