= Stripping (fiber) =

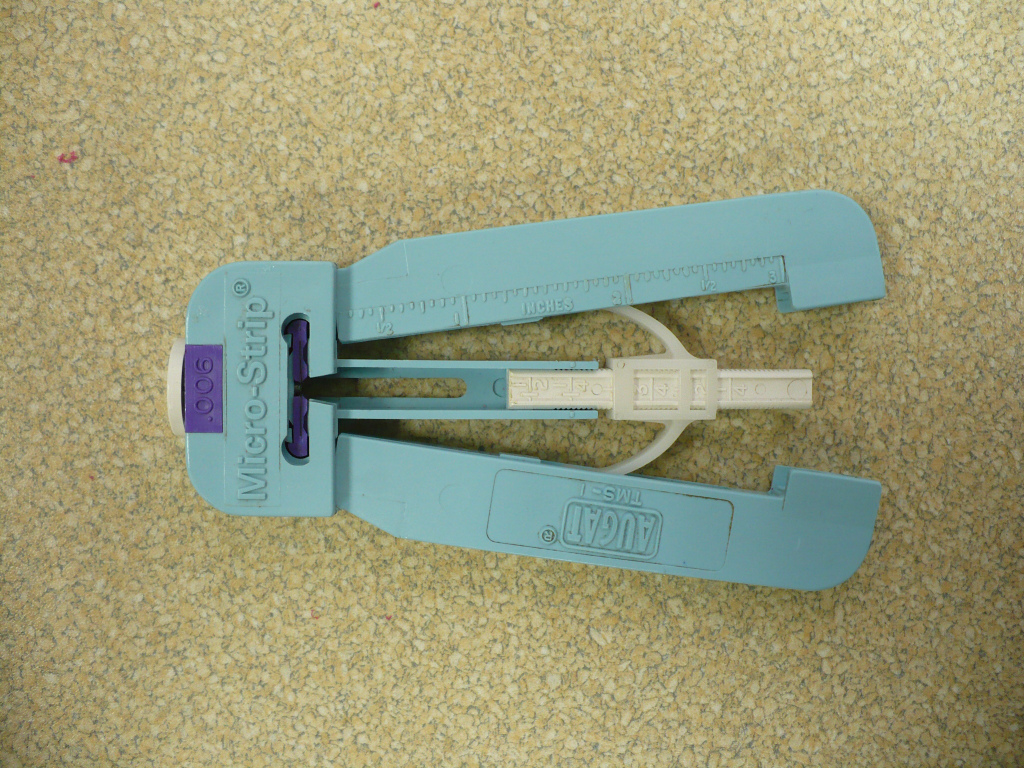
An optical fiber stripper

Stripping is the act of removing the protective polymer coating around optical fiber in preparation for fusion splicing. The splicing process begins by preparing both fiber ends for fusion, which requires that all protective coating is removed or stripped from the ends of each fiber. Fiber optical stripping can be done using a special stripping and preparation unit that uses hot sulfuric acid or a controlled flow of hot air to remove the coating. There are also mechanical tools used for stripping fiber which are similar to copper wire strippers. Fiber optical stripping and preparation equipment used in fusion splicing is commercially available through a small number of specialized companies, which usually also design machines used for fiber optical recoating.

== See also ==
- Optical communication
- Cleave (fiber)
- Fiber-optic communication
