= T-splice =

Method of joining electrical wire

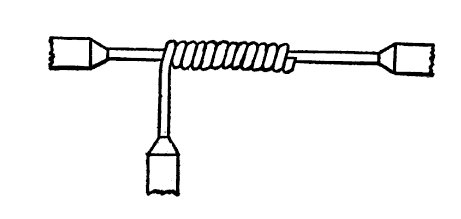
A simple T-splice in wire

In electrical wiring, a T-splice is an electrical splice that is used for connecting the end of one wire to the middle of another wire, thus forming a shape like that of the letter "T". This splice can be used with solid or stranded wires. The existing wire is called the main wire. The new wire that connects to the main wire is called the branch wire or tap wire. This is a prevalent junction type used in knob and tube wiring.

== See also ==
- Rat-tail splice
- Western Union splice
- Wire wrap
