= Cleave (fiber) =

Controlled break of an optical fiber

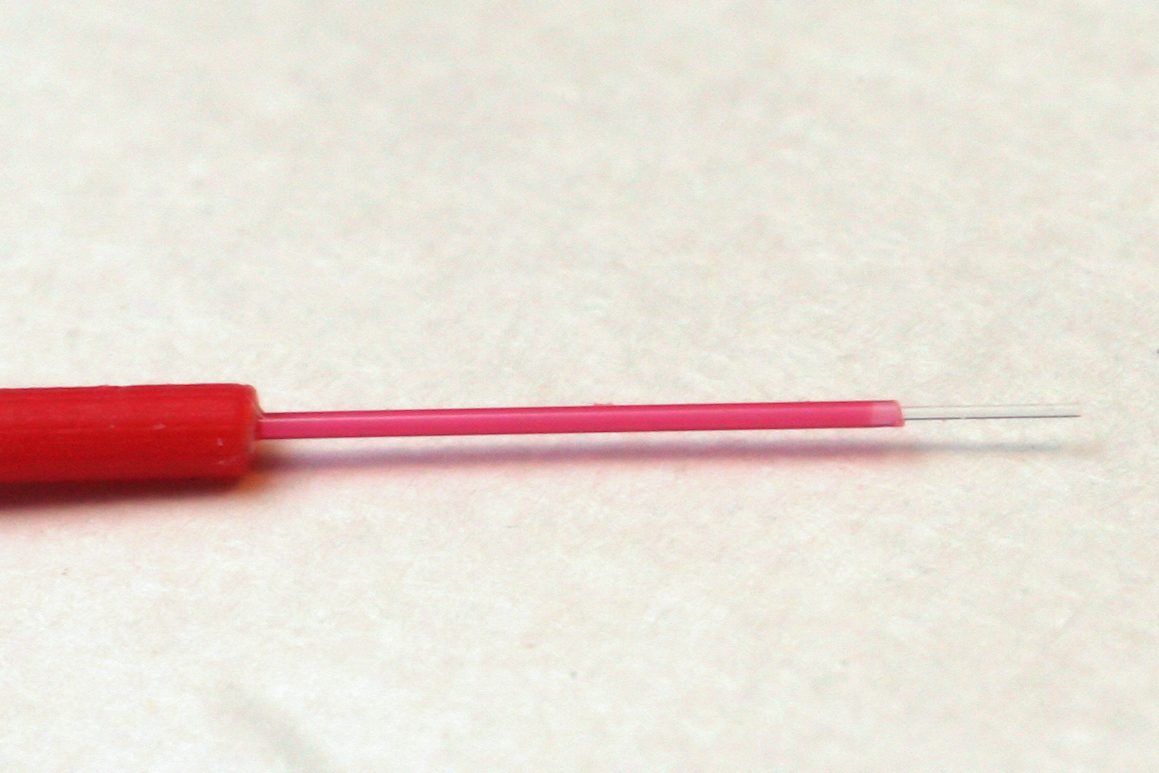
A cleaved fiber

A cleave in an optical fiber is a deliberate, controlled break, intended to create a perfectly flat end face perpendicular to the fiber's longitudinal axis. The process of cleaving an optical fiber forms one of the steps in the preparation for a fiber splice operation, regardless of the subsequent splice being a fusion splice or a mechanical splice; the other steps in the preparation being those of stripping and fiber alignment. A good cleave is required for a successful low loss splice of an optical fiber, often it is the case that fibers spliced by identical methods tend to have different losses, this difference can often be attributed to the quality of their initial cleaves.

The general method of cleaving involves a general strategy known as the scribe-and-tension or scribe-and-break strategy. This strategy involves the introduction of a small crack into the fiber and the subsequent application of a tensile force in the vicinity of the crack that causes the fiber to cleave.

== Cleaving technique ==
The scribe-and-tension strategy

A general cleaving strategy that is employed is known as the scribe-and-tension strategy or the scribe-and-break strategy. This process involves the introduction of a crack in the fiber, generally utilizing a cutting tool made from a material such as diamond, sapphire, or tungsten carbide, followed by the application of tensile stress in the vicinity of the crack. However, the specific implementations of the cleaving vary and result in cleaves of different qualities.

Certain implementations may apply the tensile force uniformly across the cross-section of the fiber, whereas others might bend the fiber around a curved surface, causing excessive tensile stress on the outside of the bend. The introduction of the crack in the fiber may also be generated in different ways; the crack may be introduced at a single point on the circumference or it may be generated all along the circumference of the fiber before the application of the tensile force. The circumferential introduction of the crack often allows fibers of considerably large diameters to be cleaved while maintaining a high quality of the cleave.

== Tools ==
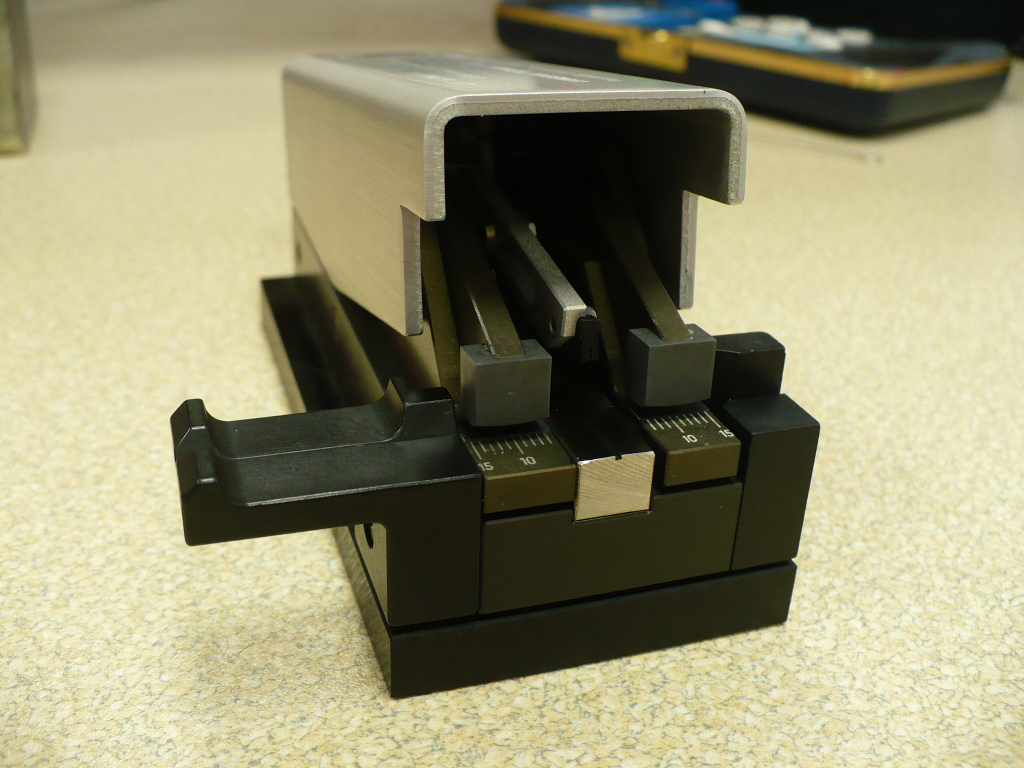
A mechanical cleaver

- A pen-shaped scribe (also known as diamond-tip scribe or diamond wedge scribe) looks like a ballpoint pen but has a small wedge tip made of diamond or other hard material. This tool is used with the "scratch and pull" technique. First, the fiber is scribed perpendicular to its length. The fiber is then pulled, which breaks at the scribe. This tool requires an experienced operator to produce good cleaves.
- Mechanical cleavers clamp the fiber in the correct position before a diamond wheel or blade scribes the fiber. Then, a force is applied and the fiber gives a nice break at the scribe. Mechanical cleavers give nicer and more repeatable cleaves.
- Multifiber cleavers are used for ribbon fiber cables.

== See also ==
- Recoating
- Stripping (fiber)
