= Mechanical splice =

Temporary joint between two optical fibers

A mechanical splice is a junction of two or more optical fibers that are aligned and held in place by a self-contained assembly (usually the size of a large carpenter's nail). The fibers are not permanently joined, just precisely held together so that light can pass from one to another. This impermanence is an important advantage over fusion splicing, as splice loss, the amount of power that the splice fails to transmit, can be better measured and prevented.

== Designs and variations ==
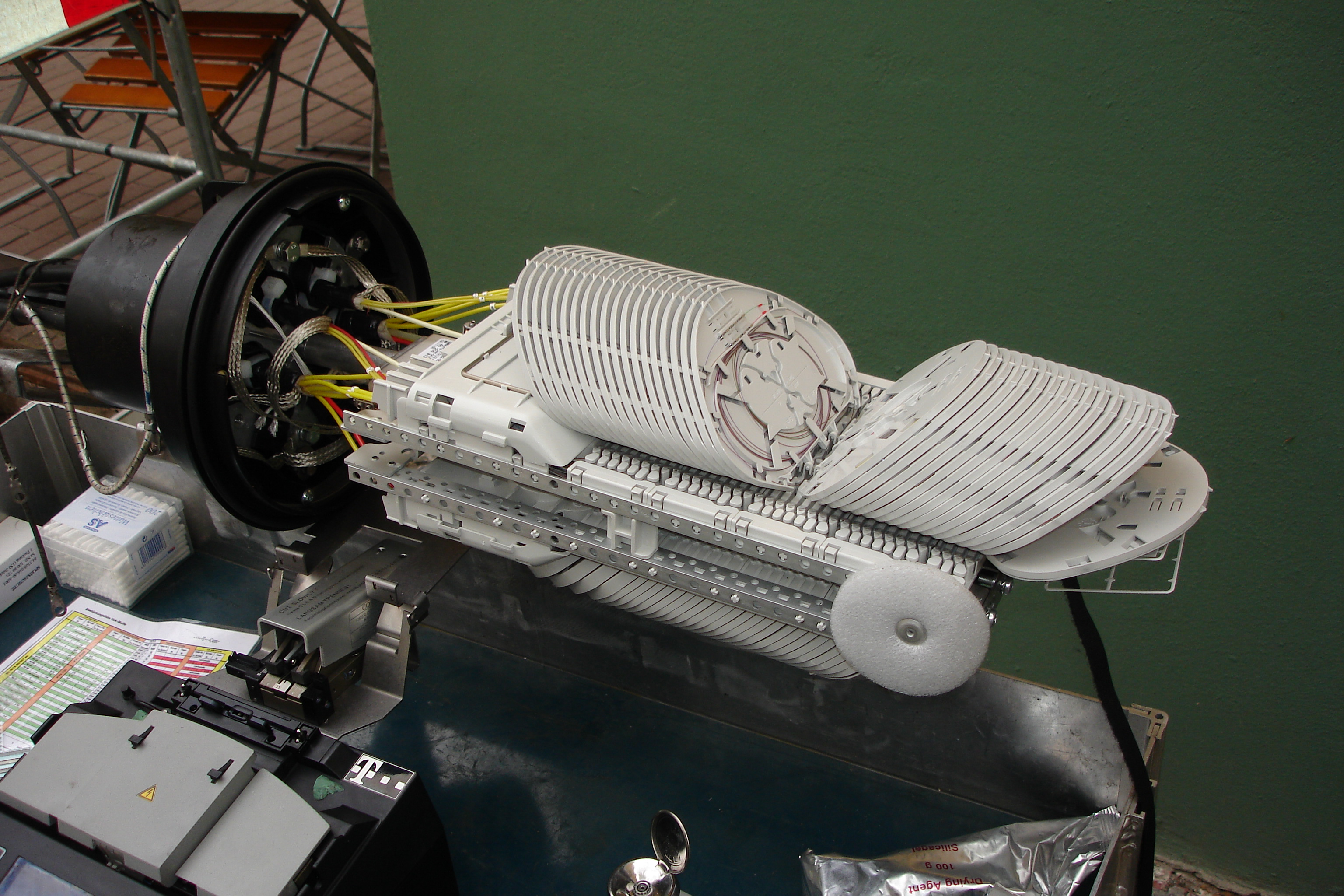
Capillary tube splices under installation in Germany.

There are several designs in use for mechanical splicing, varying based on the method of fiber alignment; four common methods, according to the Fiber Optic Association, are the capillary tube, V-groove, elastometric, and rotary splice.

- A capillary tube splice aligns the optical fibers inside of a glass tube, connecting them with a simple adhesive that matches the refractive index of the fibers. This setup allows for manual adjustments and is often a component in the more complex rotary splice.
- A V-groove plate can accommodate multiple fibers simultaneously, holding the individual fibers in separated grooves on the plate that maintain alignment. This method is popular for its simplicity and long-term effectiveness.
- An elastometric splice is similar to the V-groove in that it uses lined plates to keep the fibers aligned, but it uses a soft elastomer polymer rather than a harder material like a metal plate. The softer material allows a variety of fibers with different diameters to be used.
- A rotary splice is a more costly and complex connector which uses rotating glass ferrules to minimize splice loss. This is largely considered unpopular due to the increased amount of labor involved, as maintaining minimal splice loss requires frequent manual adjustment.

Other than the method of alignment, all forms of optical fiber splicing, including non-mechanical fusion splicing, involve an essentially identical process of cleaving and testing. Good cleaving, by creating a flat surface for fibers to be aligned and connected on, reduces splice loss in all forms of optical fiber splicing.

== See also ==
- Fusion splicing
- Optical splice
- Cleave (fiber)
- Optical fiber connector
