= Rat-tail splice =

Method of joining electrical wire

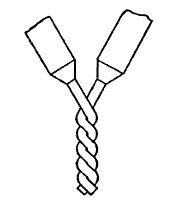
A simple rat-tail splice

A rat-tail splice, also known as a twist splice or a pig-tail splice, is a basic electrical splice that can be done with both solid and stranded wire. It is made by taking two or more bare wires and wrapping them together symmetrically around the common axis of both wires.

The bare splice can be insulated with electrical tape or by other means. This common and simple splice is not very strong mechanically. It can be made stronger by coating it with solder, which, however, renders the splice less mechanically flexible, or it can be twisted and then held in place by the internal metal spring or threads of a twist-on wire connector, also called a wire nut. For safety reasons, neither covering the splice with tape only nor soldering the splice are permitted for 110 volts or higher by most, or all, North American building electrical codes.

The rat-tail splice is not meant to connect wires that will be pulled or stressed. Rather, it is intended for wires that are protected inside an enclosure or junction box.

== See also ==
- Western Union splice
- T-splice
