= Fusion splicing =

Technique used to connect optical fibers

Video of optical-fiber fusion-splicing

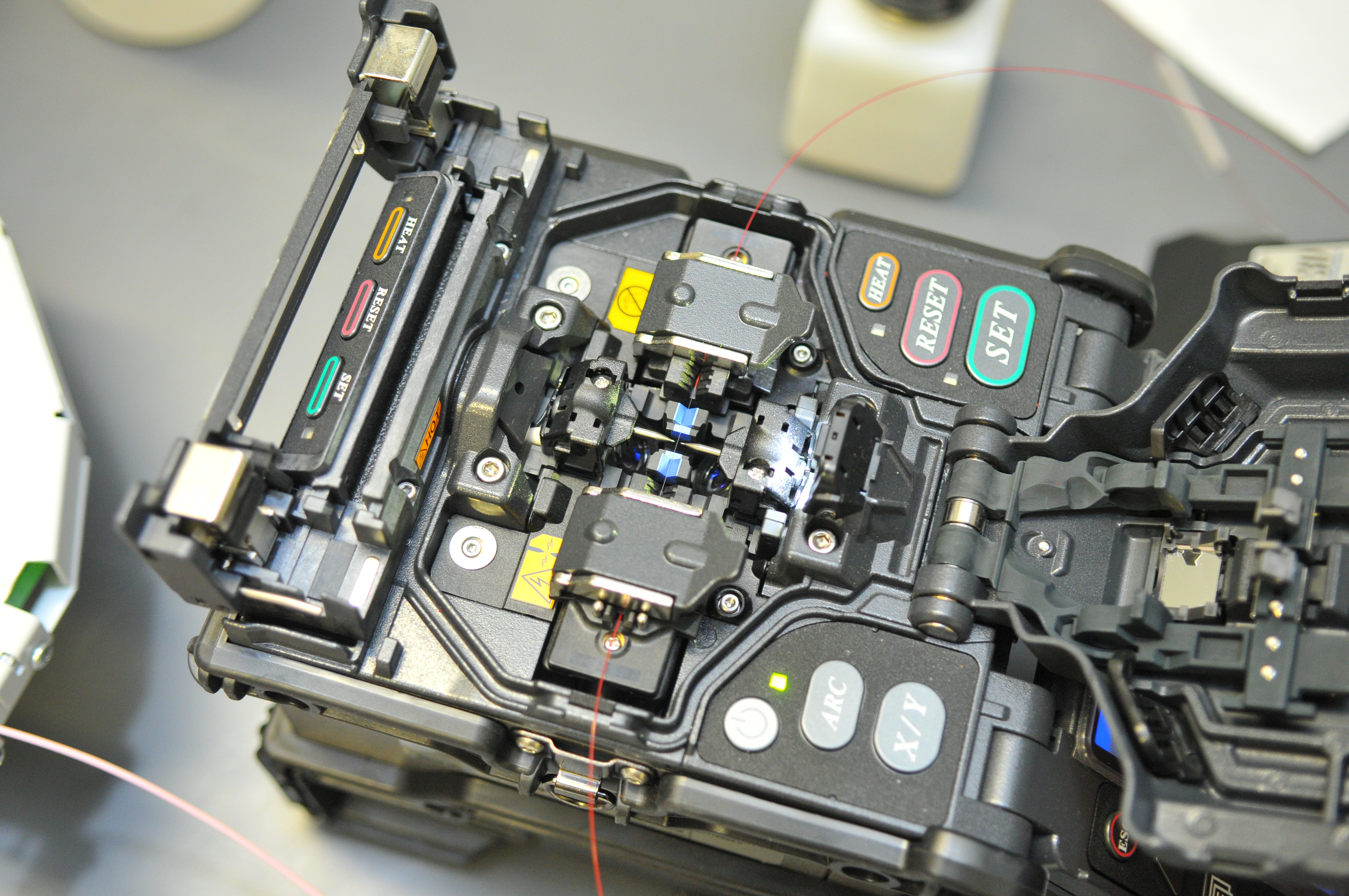
Fiber spliced, still unprotected

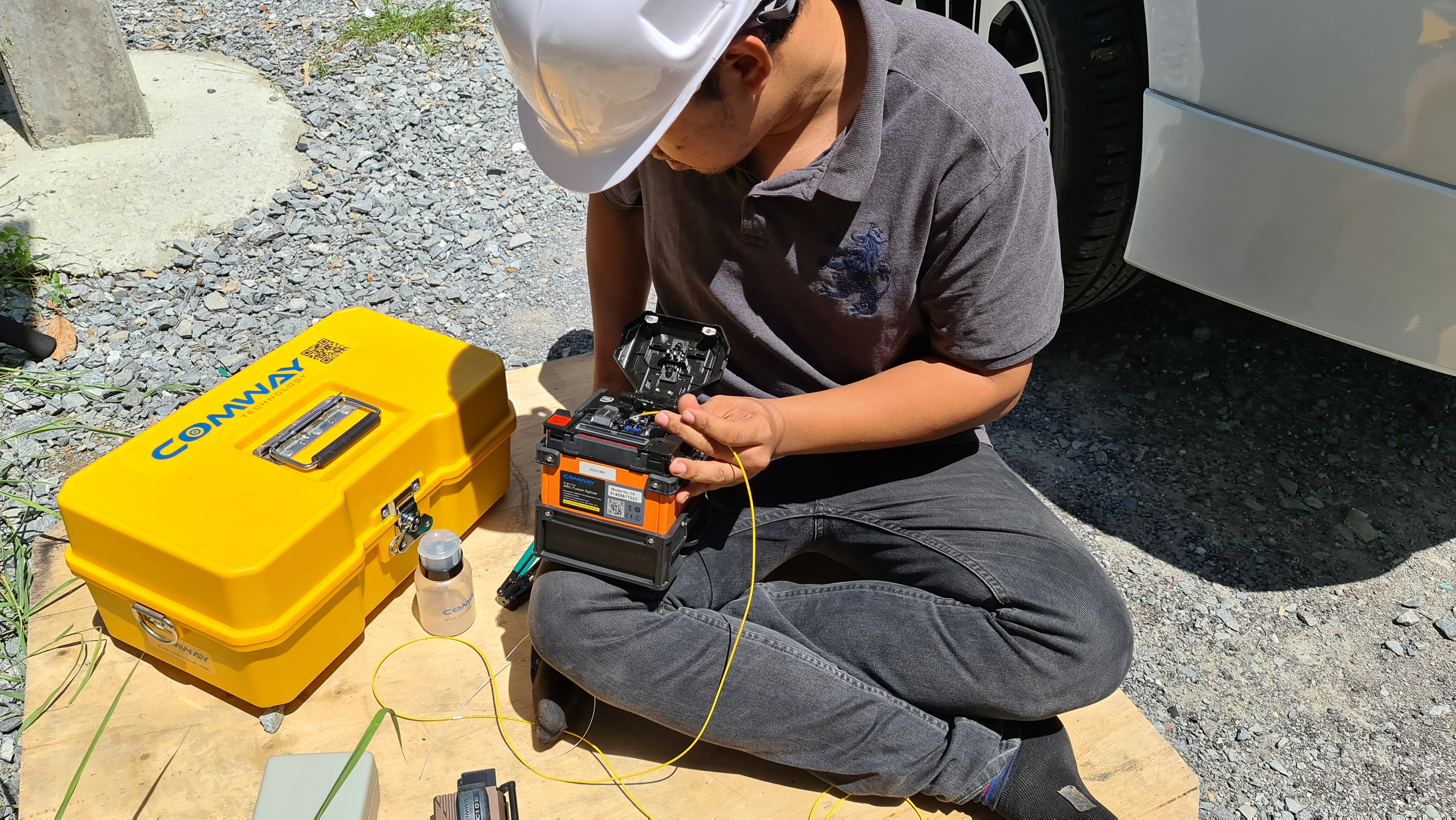
COMWAY fusion splicing

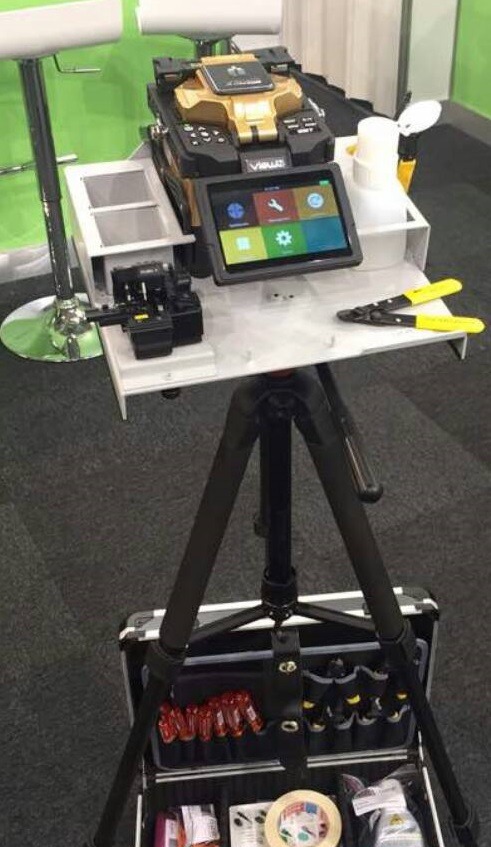
INNO View 7 splicer on a tripod and work table

Fusion splicing is the act of joining two optical fibers end-to-end. The goal is to fuse the two fibers together in such a way that light passing through the fibers is not scattered or reflected back by the splice, and so that the splice and the region surrounding it are almost as strong as the intact fiber. The source of heat used to melt and fuse the two glass fibers being spliced is usually an electric arc, but can also be a laser, a gas flame, or a tungsten filament through which current is passed.

== Governing standards ==
ANSI/EIA/TIA-455

== See also ==
- Fiber-optic communication
- Optical fiber connector
- Optical time-domain reflectometer
