= AP Sensing =

German fibre optic sensing company

AP Sensing GmbH
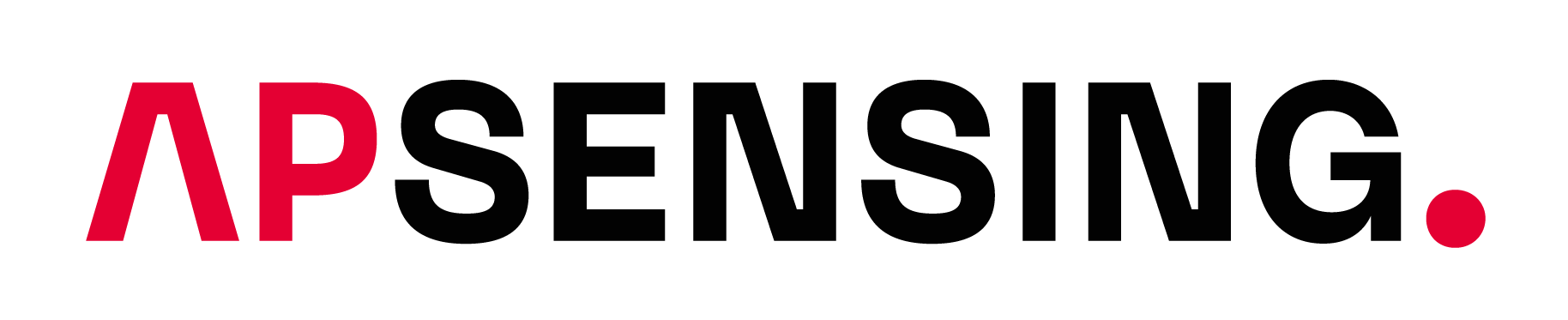
- Industry: Distributed Fibre-optic sensing (DFOS) technology
- Founded: November 2007
- Headquarters: Böblingen, Germany
- Area served: Asia Pacific, the Americas, Europe, the Middle East and Africa
- Key people: Clemens Pohl (CEO), Henrik Hoff (Business Director), Uwe Keppler (Director of Operations), Wieland Hill (Director Instruments R&D), Martin Strohbach (Director R&D Software Solutions & AI)
- Products: Distributed Temperature Sensing (DTS), Distributed Acoustic/Vibration Sensing (DAS/DVS)
- Website: http://www.apsensing.com

AP Sensing GmbH is a developer and manufacturer of distributed fibre-optic sensing (DFOS) technology products. It is headquartered in Böblingen, Germany. The company was founded in 2007 after spinning off from Agilent Technologies. AP Sensing operates in Asia Pacific, the Americas, Europe, the Middle East and Africa. AP Sensing is a member of the Fiber Optic Sensing Association (FOSA). The technology is used for fire detection in assets (i.e. tunnels, conveyor belts and special hazard buildings) and in power cable-, pipeline-, well & reservoir- and rail-monitoring systems as well as in geo- and hydrological monitoring applications.

== History and leadership ==
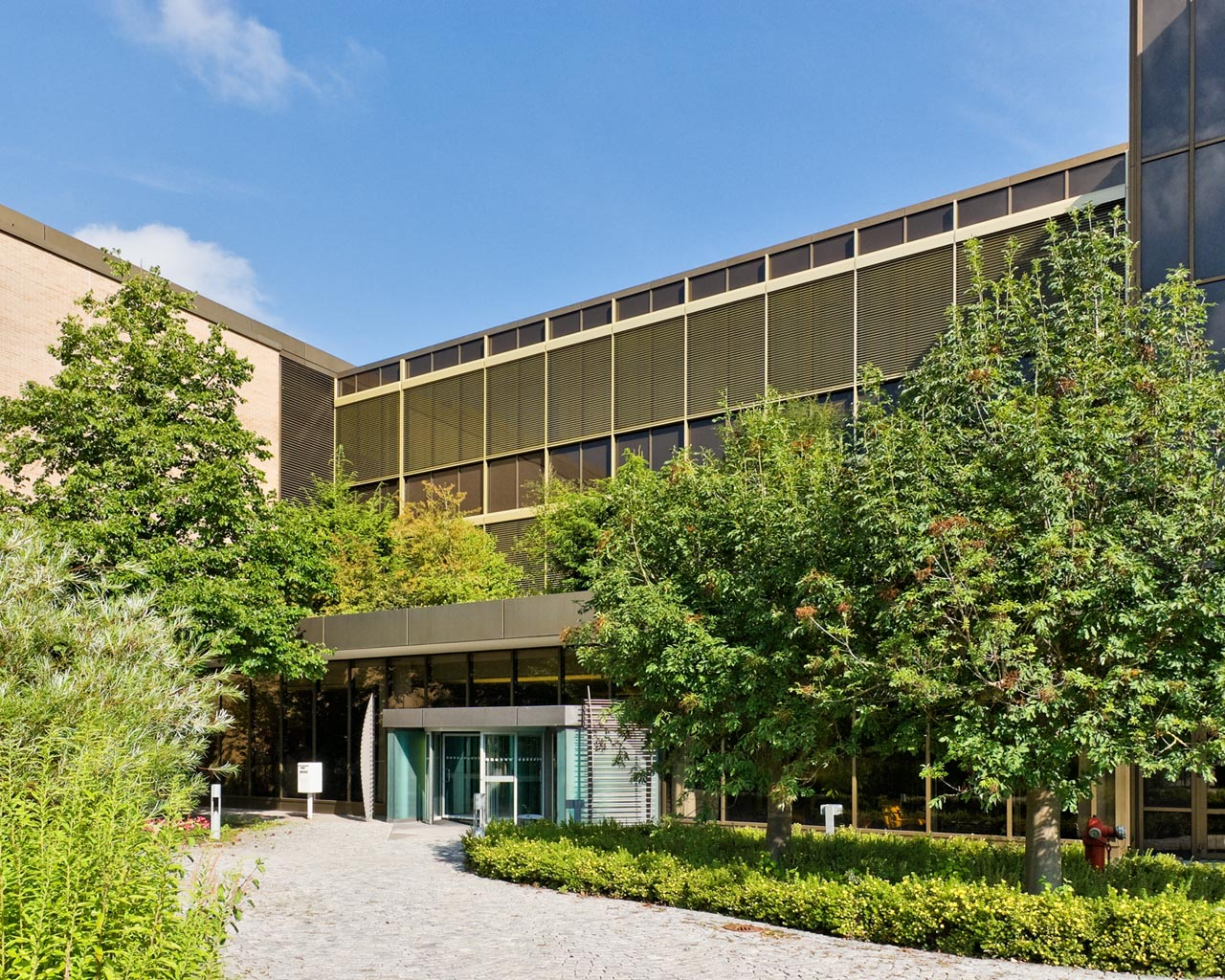
AP Sensing corporate headquarters in Böblingen, Germany

AP Sensing was founded in November 2007 and is based in Böblingen, Germany. The company originated as a part of Hewlett-Packard, which had begun investing in fibre-optic technology before spinning off Agilent Technologies in 1999. Clemens Pohl, one of the founders of AP Sensing, establishing the fibre-optic sensing business of Agilent before spinning off AP Sensing as a separate business in 2007. At its founding, its managing directors were Clemens Pohl and Gerd Koffmane. Clemens Pohl is the CEO, the Director of Operations is Uwe Keppler, and the Business Director is Henrik Hoff. Wieland Hill is director of instruments R&D) and Martin Strohbach is director of software solutions and artificial intelligence.

It is a member of the Fiber Optic Sensing Association (FOSA), an industry organization that promotes the use of fibre-optic sensing technology. Martin Strohbach of AP Sensing was elected to a board seat in 2024. According to Focus business magazine, they rank as the best employers in Germany in the electronics industry as of 2025. AP Sensing partners with WeForest, a conservationist group, and Care International.

== Products and implementation ==
Distributed fibre-optic sensing (DFOS) technology is in use in the Americas, Asia Pacific, Europe, and the Middle East, as well as in Africa.

AP Sensing designed its Distributed Temperature Sensing (DTS) technology to monitor assets such as power cables and pipelines over large distances as well as for fire detection in tunnels, industrial conveyor belts and special hazard buildings.

In the United Kingdom, AP Sensing's Distributed Acoustic Sensing/Vibration Sensing (DAS/DVS) technology is used by the Department for Transport to collect data from rail lines in order to boost safety and security. AP Sensing has worked with the School of Electronics and Computer Science at the University of Southampton on the Sofia Windfarm project. The company has collaborated with the University of Darmstadt and DB Net AG to create the FOSSIL (Fibre Optic Sensing for Safety Integrity Level) 4.0 project. Partially funded by the German Federal Ministry for Digital and Transport, the project investigates whether FOS-based digital twins can be used to improve railway security.

The company operates in Asia Pacific, the Americas, Europe, and the Middle East. Distributed fiber-optic sensing technology can be used for leak detection through DAS and DTS. AP Sensing has a regional office in Bahrain, and operates throughout the Middle East. Their Distributed Fibre Optic Sensing is designed to monitor pipeline leaks, and is used by the Kuwait Oil Company and the Abu Dhabi National Oil Company. In Saudi Arabia, AP Sensing technology used for cable monitoring by the Saudi Electricity Company, and water pipeline monitoring and leak detection by the Saline Water Conversion Corporation.

Since 2019, the Earthquake Research Institute of the University of Tokyo incorporates an AP Sensing DAS interrogator unit to monitor seismic activity off the coast of Sanriku. In 2019, AP Sensing was selected by Energinet to monitor cables at the Kriegers Flak offshore wind farm using DTS units. In 2020, Saudi Aramco approved the use of AP Sensing's DFOS technology to detect leaks in oil pipelines.
