= Ludvigsson =

Ludvigsson is a surname. Notable people with the surname include:

- Anne Ludvigsson (born 1950), Swedish social democratic politician
- Fredrik Ludvigsson (born 1994), Swedish professional road cyclist
- Jonas F. Ludvigsson, Swedish physician and epidemiologist
- Ludvig Ludvigsson Munk til Norlund (1537–1602), Danish official and count
- Olle Ludvigsson (born 1948), Swedish politician and MEP
- Tobias Ludvigsson (born 1991), Swedish cyclist

== See also ==
- Ludvigsen
