= PHOSFOS =

European optical sensing project

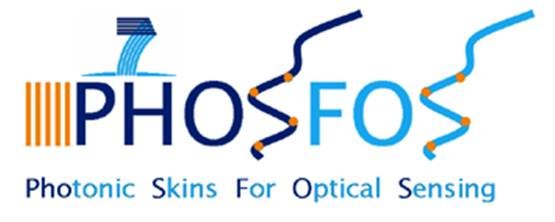

PHOSFOS (Photonic Skins For Optical Sensing) is a research and technology development project co-funded by the European Commission.

== Project Description ==
Figure 1: Flexible skin concept

Figure 2: Photograph of a real flexible skin with embedded sensors made at the Ghent University

The PHOSFOS project is developing flexible and stretchable foils or skins that integrate optical sensing elements with optical and electrical devices, such as onboard signal processing and wireless communications, as seen in Figure 1. These flexible skins can be wrapped around, embedded in, and anchored to irregularly shaped or moving objects and allow quasi-distributed sensing of mechanical quantities such as deformation, pressure, stress, and strain. This approach offers advantages over conventional sensing systems, such as increased portability and measurement range.

The sensing technology is based around sensing elements called Fiber Bragg Gratings (FBGs) that are fabricated in standard single core silica fibers, highly birefringent Microstructured fibers (MSF) and Plastic optical fibers (POF). The silica MSFs are designed to exhibit almost zero temperature sensitivity to cope with the traditional temperature cross-sensitivity issues of conventional fiber sensors. These specialty fibers are being modeled, designed, and fabricated within the programme. FBGs implemented in plastic optical fiber are also being studied because plastic fibers can be stretched up to 300% before breaking, permitting use under conditions that would result in catastrophic failure of other types of strain sensors.

Once optimized, the sensors are embedded into a flexible skin and interfaced with peripheral optoelectronics and electronics (see Figure 2).

The photonic skins developed by PHOSFOS have potential application in real-time remote monitoring of behavior and integrity of various structures such as in civil engineering (buildings, dams, bridges, roads, tunnels and mines), in aerospace (aircraft wings, helicopter blades), and in energy production (windmill blades). Applications in healthcare are also being investigated.

== Key results ==
Figure 3: Scattering of HeNe laser light from noise gratings recorded in PMMA using a 325 nm HeCd laser

A summary of the key developments can be found on the PhoSFOS EU webpage and includes the demonstration of a fully flexible opto-electronic foil.

Figure 3 shows the scattering of HeNe laser light from noise gratings recorded in PMMA using a 325 nm HeCd laser.

One of the early results from the project was in developing a repeatable method for joining polymer fiber to standard silica fiber — a major development that enabled using POF Bragg gratings in applications outside an optics lab. One of the first uses for these sensors was in monitoring strain in tapestries shown in Figure 4. In this case conventional electrical strain sensors and silica fiber sensors were shown to be strengthening the tapestries in areas where they were fixed. Because polymer fibre devices are much more flexible they did not distort the textiles as much, permitting more accurate measurement of strain.

Temperature and humidity sensing using a combined silica / POF fiber sensor has been demonstrated. Combined strain, temperature and bend sensing has also been shown. Using a fiber Bragg grating in an eccentric core polymer has been shown to yield high sensitivity to bend.

Other recent progress includes the demonstration of birefringent photonic crystal fibers with zero polarimetric sensitivity to temperature, and a successful demonstration of transversal load sensing with fibre Bragg gratings in microstructured optic fibers.

The key areas where significant progress has been made are listed below:

- Silica microstructured fibers for temperature-insensitive optical sensors - a new pressure-sensitive and temperature-insensitive optical fibre sensor has been developed. The sensor uses a fiber Bragg grating written into a microstructured fiber. The pressure sensitivity exceeds the state-of-the-art with a factor of 20, whilst the sensor is truly temperature-insensitive. The sensor is based on a novel design of a highly birefringent (10^{−3}) microstructured optical fibre sensor that is designed to have a high pressure sensitivity (3.3 pm/bar), whilst at the same time exhibit negligible temperature sensitivity (10^{−2} pm/K). The fabrication method is compatible with conventional ultraviolet grating inscription setups for fiber Bragg grating manufacture. The temperature insensitivity was achieved by tailoring the design of the doped region in the core of the microstructured fiber via a series of design iterations.
- Embedded optoelectronic devices - the possibility to integrate optical sources and photodetectors, compatible with the optical fibre sensors has been developed within the PHOSFOS project. The optoelectronic components are thinned down by polishing until they are only 20 μm thick so that they become flexible themselves without compromising functionality. Thin optical sources and detectors are then embedded in optical clear polymers, and electrically contacted using well-established micro- via, metallization and patterning technologies.
- Integrated sensors and optoelectronics - several different approaches for embedding optical fibre sensors in a flexible and stretchable host material, including injection molding, laser structuring, and soft lithography were considered. The influence of the embedding process was studied for silica and polymer fiber Bragg gratings. Temperature, humidity, strain, curvature and pressure sensitivities were fully characterized for different flexible host materials. An approach in which the embedded optoelectronic chips can be efficiently coupled towards the optical fiber sensors, using dedicated coupling structures, incorporating a 45˚ micromirror, as well as a fiber alignment groove was proposed. This allowed low cost components to be used in combination with well-established fabrication technologies, to demonstrate a truly low cost fully integrated sensing foil for biomedical applications.
- Polymer fiber Bragg gratings - prior to the commencement of PHOSFOS, gratings in polymer optical fibre (POF) only existed in the 1550 nm spectral region where the large fibre loss (1 dB/cm) only permitted very short (<10 cm) fibre lengths to be used and the devices had to be butt-coupled to a silica fiber pigtail on the optical bench.
- The PHOSFOS consortium has developed a means for reliably splicing POF to silica fibre and produced the first gratings in the 800 nm spectral region where losses are almost 2 orders of magnitude less than at 1550 nm. These developments have allowed POF grating sensors to be used outside the laboratory for the first time.
- Wavelength multiplexed polymer fiber Bragg gratings - once the fiber connection issue was solved it was possible to fabricated the first ever wavelength division multiplexed (WDM) Bragg grating sensors in polymer optical fibre (POF). Moreover, by characterizing and using the thermal annealing properties of the fibre it was possible to shift the reflecting wavelength of a grating by over 20 nm, to enable multiple WDM sensors to be recorded with a single phase mask.
- Femtosecond fiber Bragg gratings - using femtosecond lasers to inscribe fiber Bragg gratings in optical fibers, while also selectively inducing birefringence in the optical fibre at the same spatial location as the grating, has enabled the development of vectorial sensors.
- Polymers for flexible skinlike materials - a series of polymer materials were developed that have inherent flexibility and tuneable mechanical strength. They are also visually transparent and are compatible with commercially available formulations. A great step forward in developing novel monomers and prepolymers that supplement commercial formulations was taken and several novel formulations created. Finally, we also developed a new optical fiber coating material that quickly cures on silica fibres under UV irradiation.
- Sensing system for silica microstructured fibers for pressure and temperature sensing - the silica MSF based pressure sensor has great potential value potential in the field of downhole pressure monitoring within the oil and gas industry. In this application there is a need to monitor high pressures (range from 0 to 1000 bar) in combination with fast temperature variations. The ultralow temperature cross-sensitivity is therefore an important feature of this system
- Sensing system for multimode polymer fiber Bragg gratings - fiber Bragg grating sensors are commonly used for strain and temperature sensing but pressure sensing can be more challenging especially when space is limited. The PHOSFOS project consortium developed a new polymer multipoint FBG sensor that can measure the pressure in various medical applications. The fact that polymer fiber is used rather than silica fiber is beneficial in terms of patient safely. The low Young's modulus of polymer fiber improves the strain transfer from the surrounding medium to the sensors.

== Consortium ==
- , Vrije Universiteit Brussel
- , Interuniversitair Micro-Electronica Centrum VZW
- , Ghent University
- , Politechnika Wroclawska
- , Maria Curie-Skłodowska University
- , Aston University
- , Fiber Optic Sensors and Systems BVBA
- , Cyprus University of Technology
- , Astasense Limited

== Open meetings ==
The 2nd "Benefits for Industry" Meeting of the EU FP7 Project PHOSFOS will take place on Sunday 22 May 2011 in Munich (Germany).

The meeting is co-located with the Industry Meets Academia Workshop organized by SPIE as part of the Optical Metrology Conference. It will be followed by the World of Photonics Congress and the Laser World of Photonics Trade Fair in Munich, in the week from 23 to 26 May 2011.

This Meeting is the second in its kind gathering all companies that have expressed their possible interest in the technology developed by the EU FP7 project PHOSFOS.

18 companies/institutes have registered for the Industrial User Club of PHOSFOS, new members are welcome.
