= Ludvigsen =

Ludvigsen is a surname. Notable people with the surname include:

- Bjarte Ludvigsen (born 1975), a.k.a. Blue, record producer from Bergen, Norway
- Bjørn Ludvigsen (1969–2025), Norwegian footballer
- Gunvald Ludvigsen (born 1949), Norwegian politician for the Liberal Party
- Hanne Ludvigsen, Danish-Finnish optical engineer
- Ida Nyrop Ludvigsen (1927–1973), Danish translator and official
- Inge Ludvigsen (born 1965), is a retired Norwegian footballer
- Ingvard Ludvigsen (1904–1965), Danish boxer who competed in the 1928 Summer Olympics
- Karl Ludvigsen (born 1934), American motoring journalist
- Knutsen & Ludvigsen, Norwegian singing duo, Øystein Dolmen ("Knutsen") and Gustav Lorentzen ("Ludvigsen")
- Ludvig Ludvigsen Daae (1834–1910), Norwegian historian
- Malcolm Ludvigsen (born 1946), artist and scientist
- Per-Ove Ludvigsen (born 1966), former Norwegian football player
- Roger Ludvigsen (born 1965), Sami guitarist, percussionist and composer from Kautokeino
- Sonja Ludvigsen (1928–1974), Norwegian politician, member of the Labour Party
- Svein Ludvigsen (born 1946), Norwegian politician for the Conservative Party
- Trond Fredrik Ludvigsen (born 1982), Norwegian footballer

== See also ==
- Ludvig
