= Hanne Ludvigsen =

Danish optical engineer

Hanne Ludvigsen is an optical engineer. Educated in Denmark and Finland, she works in Finland as senior university lecturer in the Aalto University Department of Electronics and Nanoengineering. Her research involves microstructured optical fibers and their applications in optical sensing and supercontinuum generation.

== Education ==
Ludvigsen earned a bachelor's degree in natural sciences from Aarhus University. She came to the Helsinki University of Technology (now part of Aalto University) for graduate study in engineering and technology, earning a licenciate in 1990 and completing her PhD in 1994. Her dissertation was Diodilasereiden taajuuden stabilointi optisen mittaustekniikan sovelluksiin [Frequency stabilization of diode lasers for applications in optical measurement technology].

== Recognition ==
Optica named her as a 2024 Optica Fellow, "for outstanding contributions to the field of photonic crystal fibers and optical sensors".
