= Supercontinuum =

Concept in optics

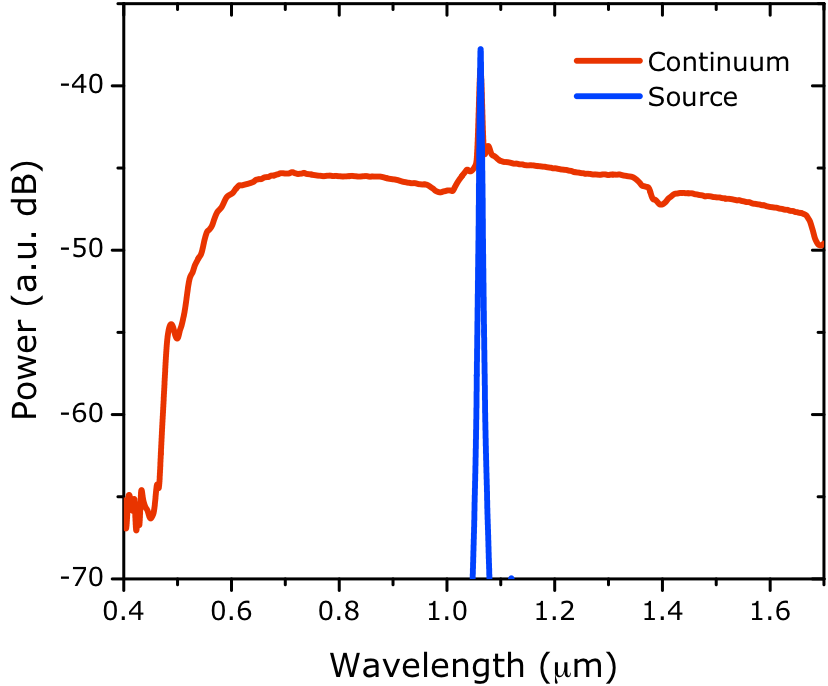
Figure 1. A typical supercontinuum spectrum. The blue line shows the spectrum of the pump source launched into a photonic crystal fiber while the red line shows the resulting supercontinuum spectrum generated after propagating through the fiber.

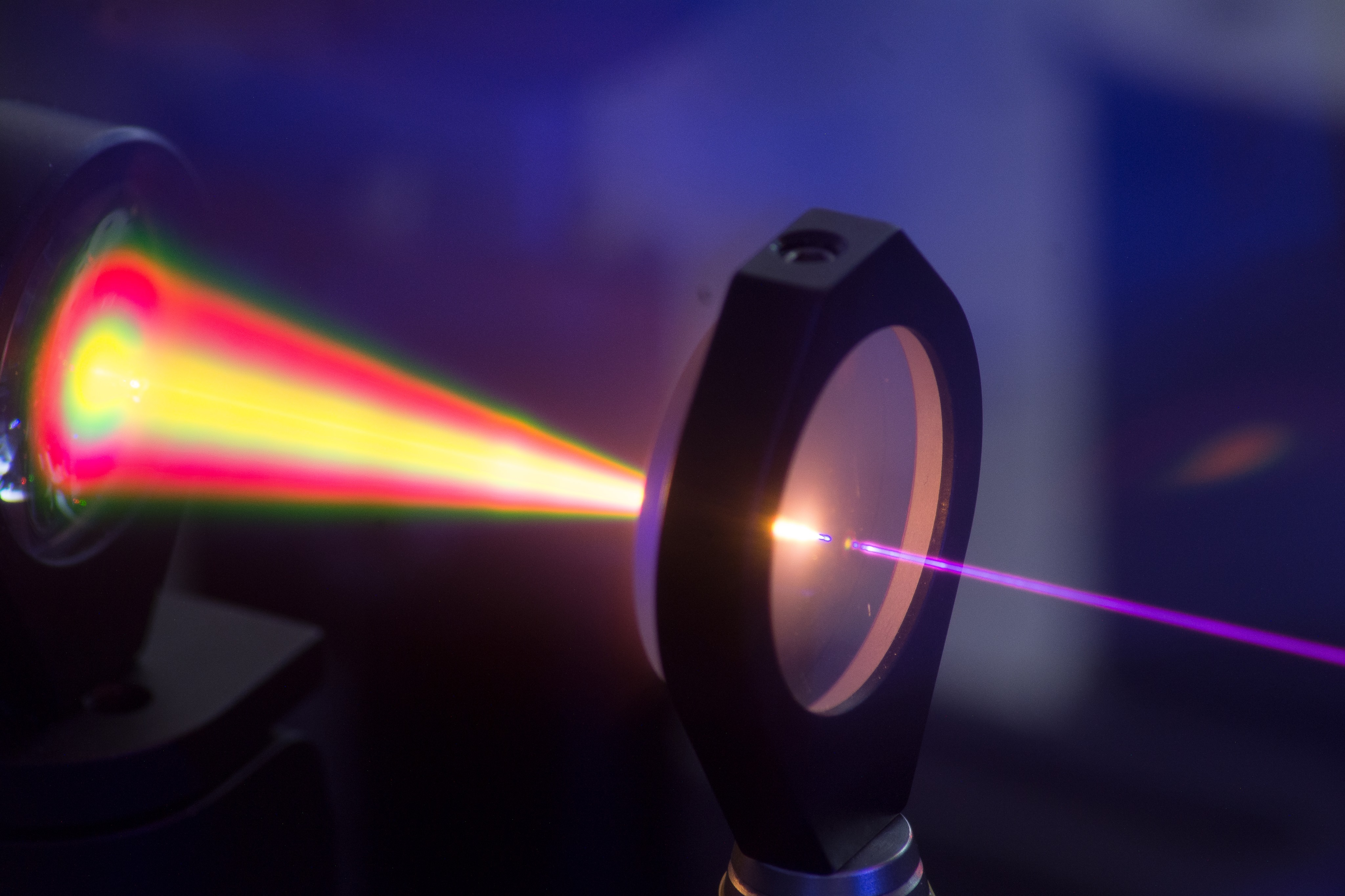
Image of a typical supercontinuum. This supercontinuum was generated by focusing 800 nm, sub-100 fs pulses into a yttrium aluminium garnet (YAG) crystal, generating ultra broadband light that spans both the visible and NIR.

In optics, a supercontinuum is formed when a collection of nonlinear processes act together upon a pump beam in order to cause severe spectral broadening of the original pump beam, for example using a microstructured optical fiber. The result is a smooth spectral continuum (see figure 1 for a typical example). There is no consensus on how much broadening constitutes a supercontinuum; however researchers have published work claiming as little as 60 nm of broadening as a supercontinuum. There is also no agreement on the spectral flatness required to define the bandwidth of the source, with authors using anything from 5 dB to 40 dB or more. In addition the term supercontinuum itself did not gain widespread acceptance until this century, with many authors using alternative phrases to describe their continua during the 1970s, 1980s and 1990s.

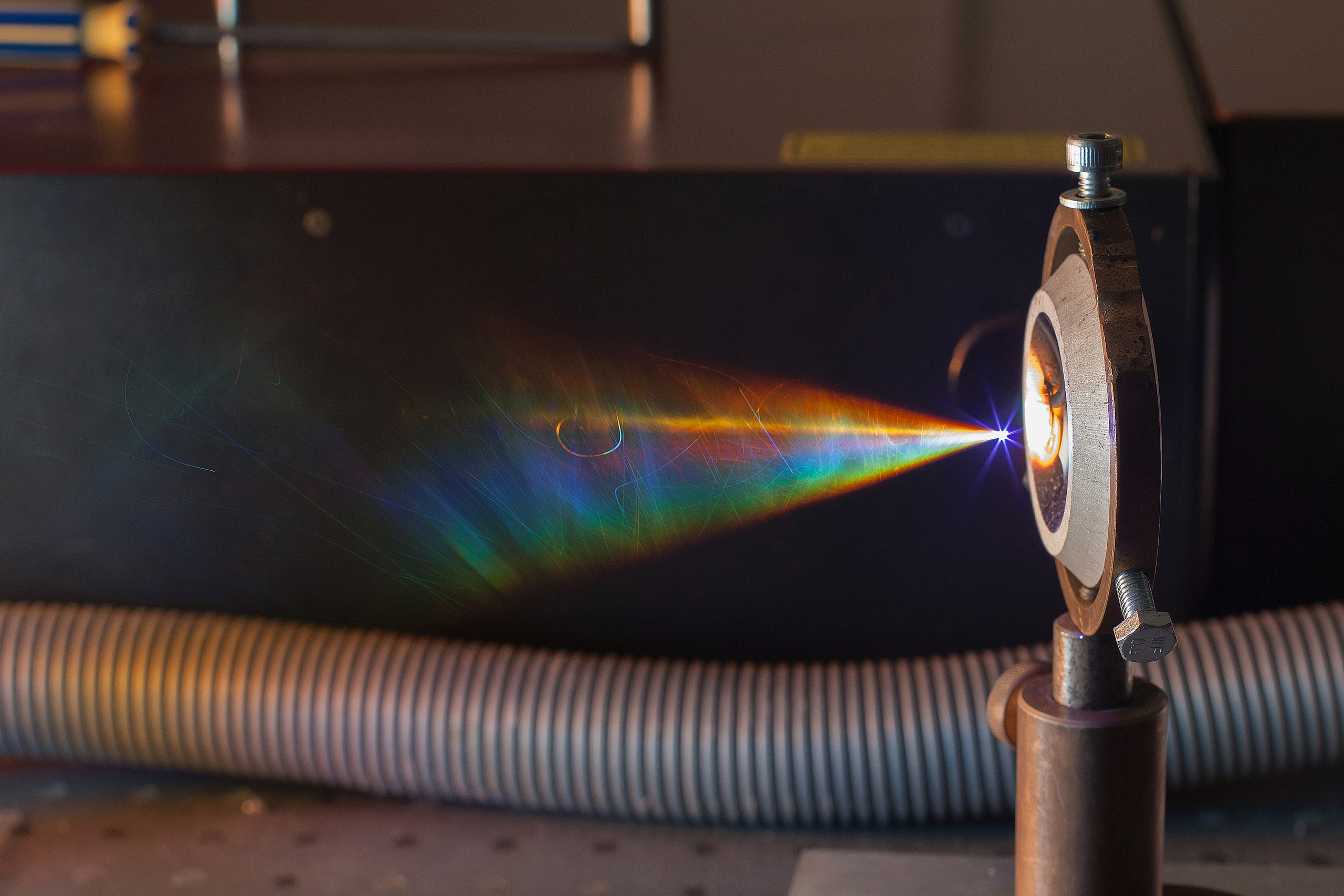
Typical coloured pattern from a femtosecond beam tight focused in air; note the beam is passing from right, being invisible until a spark is generated due to strong electric field in its focus

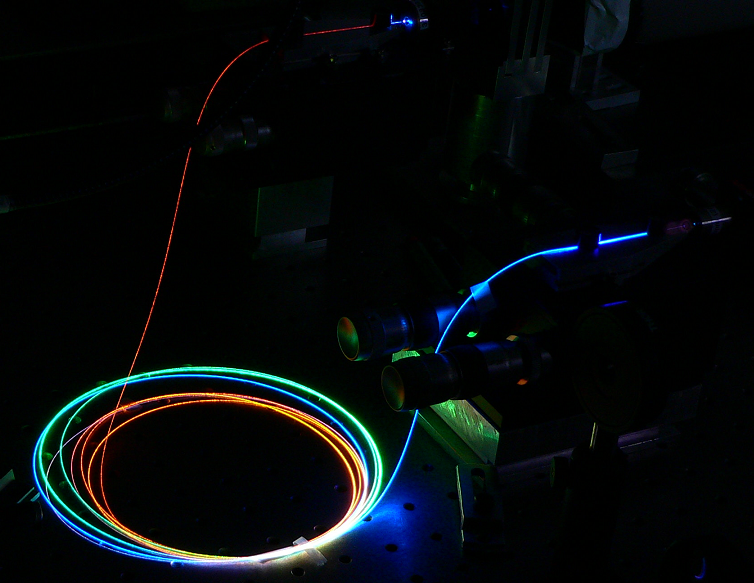
Propagation of ultrashort laser pulses in a microstructured optical fiber. The input laser light (bottom of the picture, not visible before entry into the fiber) is near-infrared and generates wavelengths covering most of the visible spectrum.

Supercontinuum generation from a photonic crystal optical fiber (seen as a glowing thread on the left) for gradually increasing intensity of a pump laser. On the right, the spectrum of the supercontinuum is shown after the output beam passed through a prism. The higher the pump intensity, the broader the supercontinuum. The pump laser is an 800nm femtosecond laser.

In the decade leading up to 2014, the development of supercontinua sources emerged as a research field. This is largely due to technological developments, which have allowed more controlled and accessible generation of supercontinua. This renewed research has created a variety of new light sources which are finding applications in a diverse range of fields, including optical coherence tomography, frequency metrology, fluorescence lifetime imaging, optical communications, gas sensing, and many others. The application of these sources has created a feedback loop whereby the scientists utilising the supercontinua are demanding better customisable continua to suit their particular applications. This has driven researchers to develop novel methods to produce these continua and to develop theories to understand their formation and aid future development. As a result, rapid progress has been made in developing these sources since 2000.

While supercontinuum generation has for long been the preserve of fibers, in the years leading up to 2012, integrated waveguides came of age to produce extremely broad spectra, opening the door to more economical, compact, robust, scalable, and mass-producible supercontinuum sources.

== Historical overview ==
=== The 1960s and 1970s ===
In 1964 Jones and Stoicheff reported using a continua generated by a maser to study induced Raman absorption in liquids at optical frequencies. It had been noted by Stoicheff in an early publication that "when the maser emission was in a single sharp spectral line, all the Raman emission lines were sharp; whenever the maser emission contained additional components, all of the Raman emission lines, with the exception of the first Stokes line, were considerably broadened, sometimes up to several hundred cm^{−1}." These weak continua, as they were described, allowed the first Raman absorption spectroscopy measurements to be made.

In 1970 Alfano and Shapiro reported the first measurements of frequency broadening in crystals and glasses using a frequency doubled Nd:Glass mode-locked laser. The output pulses were approximately 4 ps and had a pulse energy of 5 mJ. The filaments formed produced the first white light spectra in the range from 400-700 nm and the authors explained their formation through self-phase modulation and four-wave mixing. The filaments themselves were of no real use as a source; nevertheless the authors suggested that the crystals might prove useful as ultrafast light gates. Alfano is the discoverer and inventor of the supercontinuum in 1970 with three seminal articles in same issue of Phy Rev Letters (24, 592,584,1217(1970)) on ultimate white light source now called supercontinuum.

The study of atomic vapours, organic vapours, and liquids by Raman absorption spectroscopy through the 1960s and 1970s drove the development of continua sources. By the early 1970s, continua formed by nanosecond duration flash lamps and laser-triggered breakdown spark in gases, along with laser-excited fluorescence continua from scintillator dyes, were being used to study the excited states. These sources all had problems; what was required was a source that produced broad continua at high power levels with a reasonable efficiency. In 1976 Lin and Stolen reported a new nanosecond source that produced continua with a bandwidth of 110-180 nm centred on 530 nm at output powers of around a kW. The system used a 10-20 kW dye laser producing 10 ns pulses with 15-20 nm of bandwidth to pump a 19.5 m-long (64 ft), 7 μm core diameter silica fibre. They could only manage a coupling efficiency in the region of 5-10%.

By 1978 Lin and Nguyen reported several continua, most notably one stretching from 0.7-1.6 μm using a 315 m-long (1,033 ft) GeO$\textstyle _2$-doped silica fibre with a 33 μm core. The optical setup was similar to Lin's previous work with Stolen, except in this instance the pump source was a 150 kW, 20 ns, Q-switched Nd:YAG laser. Indeed, they had so much power available to them that two thirds was attenuated away to prevent damage to the fibre. The 50 kW coupled into the fibre emerged as a 12 kW continuum. Stokes lines were clearly visible up to 1.3 μm, at which point the continuum began to smooth out, except for a large loss due to water absorption at 1.38 μm. As they increased the launch power beyond 50 kW they noted that the continuum extends down into the green part of the visible spectrum. However, the higher power levels quickly damaged their fibre. In the same paper they also pumped a single mode fibre with a 6 μm core diameter and "a few 100 m in length." It generated a similar continuum spanning from 0.9 μm to 1.7 μm with reduced launch and output powers. Without realising it, they had also generated optical solitons for the first time.

=== The 1980s ===
In 1980 Fujii et al. repeated Lin's 1978 setup with a mode-locked Nd:YAG. The peak power of the pulses was reported as being greater than 100 kW and they achieved better than 70% coupling efficiency into a 10 μm core single-mode Ge-doped fibre. Unusually, they did not report their pulse duration. Their spectrum spanned the entire spectral window in silica from 300 nm to 2100 nm. The authors concerned themselves with the visible side of the spectrum and identified the main mechanism for generation to be four-wave mixing of the pump and Raman generated Stokes. However, there were some higher order modes, which were attributed to sum-frequency generation between the pump and Stokes lines. The phase-matching condition was met by coupling of the up-converted light and the quasi-continuum of cladding modes.

A further advance was reported by Washio et al. in 1980 when they pumped 150 m (490 ft) of single-mode fibre with a 1.34 μm Q-switched Nd:YAG laser. This was just inside the anomalous dispersion regime for their fibre. The result was a continuum which stretched from 1.15 to 1.6 μm and showed no discrete Stokes lines.

Up to this point no one had really provided a suitable explanation why the continuum smoothed out between the Stokes lines at longer wavelengths in fibres. In the majority of cases this is explained by soliton mechanisms; however, solitons were not reported in fibres until 1985. It was realised that self-phase modulation could not account for the broad continua seen, but for the most part little else was offered as an explanation.

In 1982 Smirnov et al. reported similar results to that achieved by Lin in 1978. Using multimode phosphosilicate fibres pumped at 0.53 and 1.06 μm, they saw the normal Stokes components and a spectrum which extended from the ultraviolet to the near infrared. They calculated that the spectral broadening due to self-phase modulation should have been 910 cm^{−1}, but their continuum was greater than 3000 cm^{−1}. They concluded that "an optical continuum cannot be explained by self-phase modulation alone." They continued by pointing out the difficulties of phase-matching over long lengths of fibre to maintain four-wave mixing, and reported an unusual damage mechanism (with hindsight this would probably be considered a very short fibre fuse). They note a much earlier suggestion by Loy and Shen that if the nanosecond pulses consisted of sub-nanosecond spikes in a nanosecond envelope, it would explain the broad continuum.

This idea of very short pulses resulting in the broad continuum was studied a year later when Fork et al. reported using 80 fs pulses from a colliding mode-locked laser. The laser's wavelength was 627 nm and they used it to pump a jet of ethylene glycol. They collimated the resulting continuum and measured the pulse duration at different wavelengths, noting that the red part of the continuum was at the front of the pulse and the blue at the rear. They reported very small chirps across the continuum. These observations and others led them to state that self-phase modulation was the dominant effect by some margin. However they also noted that their calculations showed that the continuum remained much larger than self-phase modulation would allow, suggesting that four-wave mixing processes must also be present. They stated that it was much easier to produce a reliable, repeatable continuum using a femtosecond source. Over the ensuing years this source was developed further and used to examine other liquids.

In the same year Nakazawa and Tokuda reported using the two transitions in Nd:YAG at 1.32 and 1.34 μm to pump a multimode fibre simultaneously at these wavelengths. They attributed the continuum spectrum to a combination of forced four-wave mixing and a superposition of sequential stimulated Raman scattering. The main advantage of this was that they were able to generate a continuum at the relatively low pump powers of a few kW, compared to previous work.

During the early to late 1980s Alfano, Ho, Corkum, Manassah and others carried out a wide variety of experiments, though very little of it involved fibres. The majority of the work centred on using faster sources (10 ps and below) to pump various crystals, liquids, gases, and semiconductors in order to generate continua mostly in the visible region. Self-phase modulation was normally used to explain the processes although from the mid-1980s other explanations were offered, including second harmonic generation cross-phase modulation and induced phase modulation. Indeed, efforts were made to explain why self-phase modulation might well result in much broader continua, mostly through modifications to theory by including factors such as a slowly varying amplitude envelope among others.

In 1987 Gomes et al. reported cascaded stimulated Raman scattering in a single mode phosphosilicate-based fibre. They pumped the fibre with a Q-switched and mode-locked Nd:YAG, which produced 130 ps pulses with 700 kW peak power. They launched up to 56 kW into the fibre and as a result of the phosphorus achieved a much broader and flatter continuum than had been achieved to that point with silica fibre. A year later Gouveia-Neto et al. from the same group published a paper describing the formation and propagation of soliton waves from modulation instability. They used a 1.32 μm Nd:YAG laser which produced 100 ps pulses with 200 W peak power to pump 500 m (1,600 ft) of single mode fibre with a 7 μm core diameter. The zero-dispersion wavelength of the fibre was at 1.30 μm, placing the pump just inside the anomalous dispersion regime. They noted pulses emerging with durations of less than 500 fs (solitons) and as they increased the pump power a continuum was formed stretching from 1.3 to 1.5 μm.

=== The 1990s ===
Gross et al. in 1992 published a paper modelling the formation of supercontinua (in the anomalous group velocity dispersion region) when generated by femtosecond pulses in fibre. It was easily the most complete model, to that date, with fundamental solitons and soliton self-frequency shift emerging as solutions to the equations.

The applicability of supercontinua for use in wavelength-division multiplexed (WDM) systems for optical communications was investigated heavily during the 1990s. In 1993 Morioka et al. reported a 100 wavelength channel multiplexing scheme which simultaneously produced one hundred 10 ps pulses in the 1.224-1.394 μm spectra region with a 1.9 nm spectral spacing. They produced a supercontinuum using a Nd:YLF pump centred on 1.314 μm which was mode-locked to produce 7.6 ps pulses. They then filtered the resulting continuum with a birefringent fibre to generate the channels.

Morioka and Mori continued development of telecommunications technologies utilising supercontinuum generation throughout the 1990s up to the present day. Their research included: using a supercontinua to measure the group velocity dispersion in optical fibres; the demonstration of a 1 Tbit/s-based WDM system; and more recently a 1000 channel dense wavelength-division multiplexed (DWDM) system capable of 2.8 Tbit/s using a supercontinuum fractionally more than 60 nm wide.

The first demonstration of a fibre-based supercontinuum pumped by a fibre-based laser was reported by Chernikov et al. in 1997. They made use of distributed backscattering to achieve passive Q-switching in single-mode ytterbium- and erbium-doped fibres. The passive Q-switching produced pulses with a 10 kW peak power and a 2 ns duration. The resulting continuum stretched from 1 μm to the edge of the silica window at 2.3 μm. The first three Stokes lines were visible and the continuum stretched down to about 0.7 μm but at significantly reduced power levels.

=== Progress since 2000 ===
Advances made during the 1980s meant that it had become clear that to get the broadest continua in fibre, it was most efficient to pump in the anomalous dispersion regime. However it was difficult to capitalise upon this with high-power 1 μm lasers as it had proven extremely difficult to achieve a zero-dispersion wavelength of much less than 1.3 μm in conventional silica fibre. A solution appeared with the invention of photonic-crystal fibers (PCF) in 1996 by Knight et al. The properties of PCFs are discussed in detail elsewhere, but they have two properties which make PCF an excellent medium for supercontinuum generation, namely: high nonlinearity and a customisable zero-dispersion wavelength. Among the first was Ranka et al. in 2000, who used a 75 cm PCF with a zero-dispersion at 767 nm and a 1.7 μm core diameter. They pumped the fibre with 100 fs, 800 pJ pulses at 790 nm to produce a flat continuum from between 400 and 1450 nm.

This work was followed by others pumping short lengths of PCF with zero-dispersions around 800 nm with high-power femtosecond Ti:sapphire lasers. Lehtonen et al. studied the effect of polarization on the formation of the continua in a birefringent PCF, as well as varying the pump wavelength (728-810 nm) and pulse duration (70-300 fs). They found that the best continua were formed just inside the anomalous region with 300 fs pulses. Shorter pulses resulted in clear separation of the solitons which were visible in the spectral output. Herrmann et al. provided a convincing explanation of the development of femtosecond supercontinua, specifically the reduction of solitons from high orders down to the fundamental and the production of dispersive waves during this process. Fully fibre-integrated femtosecond sources have since been developed and demonstrated.

Other areas of development since 2000 have included: supercontinua sources that operate in the picosecond, nanosecond, and CW regimes; the development of fibres to include new materials, production techniques and tapers; novel methods for generating broader continua; novel propagation equations for describing supercontinuum in photonic nanowires, and the development of numerical models to explain and aid understanding of supercontinuum generation.

==== Supercontinuum generation in integrated photonics platforms ====
While optical fibers have been the workhorse of supercontinuum generation since its inception, integrated waveguide-based sources of supercontinuum have become an active area of research in the twenty first century. These chip-scale platforms promise to miniaturize supercontinuum sources into devices that are compact, robust, scalable, mass producible and more economical. Such platforms also allow dispersion engineering by varying the cross-sectional geometry of the waveguide. Silicon bases materials such as silica, silicon nitride, crystalline silicon, and amorphous silicon have demonstrated supercontinuum generation spanning the visible, near-infrared, and mid-infrared regions of the electromagnetic spectrum. As of 2015, the widest supercontinuum generated on chip extends from 470 nm in the visible to 2130 nm for the infrared wavelength region.

A related dispersion-engineering approach is sign-alternated dispersion, in which the sign of the group-velocity dispersion is repeatedly alternated along the propagation direction. Zia et al. reported that this approach can mitigate spectral-broadening stagnation and significantly reduce the peak-power requirement for supercontinuum generation in optical fibers and integrated waveguides. The concept relies on alternating segments of normal and anomalous dispersion along the waveguide to repeatedly reshape the pulse and enhance spectral broadening while maintaining coherence. Subsequent studies demonstrated that sign-alternating-dispersion waveguides can significantly improve efficiency in integrated photonics, enabling broadband supercontinuum generation at picojoule-level pulse energies. Related work also explored nonlinear pulse compression and phase dynamics in such structures.

== Description of dynamics of continuum formation in fiber ==
In this section we will briefly discuss the dynamics of the two main regimes in which supercontinua are generated in fibre. As previously stated a supercontinuum occurs through the interaction of many nonlinear processes to cause extensive spectral broadening. Many of these processes such as: self-phase modulation, four-wave mixing, and soliton-based dynamics have been well understood, individually, for some time. The breakthroughs in recent years have involved understanding and modelling how all these processes interact together to generate supercontinua and how parameters can be engineered to enhance and control continuum formation. The two main regimes are the soliton fission regime and modulation instability regime. The physical processes can be considered to be quite similar and the descriptions really enable us to distinguish between the processes that drive the continuum formation for varying pump conditions. A third regime, pumping in the normal dispersion region, is also covered. This is a perfectly viable way to generate a supercontinuum. However, it is not possible to generate the same bandwidths by this method.

=== Soliton fission regime ===
In the soliton fission regime a short, high-power, femtosecond pulse is launched into the PCF or other highly nonlinear fiber. The femtosecond pulse may be considered as a high order soliton, consequently it rapidly broadens and then fissions into fundamental solitons. During the fission process excess energy is shed as dispersive waves on the short wavelength side. Generally these dispersive waves will undergo no further shifting and thus the extension short of the pump is dependent on how broadly the soliton expands as it breathes. The fundamental solitons then undergo intra-pulse Raman scattering and shift to longer wavelengths (also known as the soliton self-frequency shift), generating the long wavelength side of the continuum. It is possible for the soliton Raman continuum to interact with the dispersive radiation via four-wave mixing and cross-phase modulation. Under certain circumstances, it is possible for these dispersive waves to be coupled with the solitons via the soliton trapping effect. This effect means that as the soliton self-frequency shifts to longer wavelengths, the coupled dispersive wave is shifted to shorter wavelengths as dictated by the group velocity matching conditions. Generally, this soliton trapping mechanism allows for the continuum to extend to shorter wavelengths than is possible via any other mechanism.

The first supercontinuum generated in PCF operated in this regime and many of the subsequent experiments also made use of ultra-short pulsed femtosecond systems as a pump source. One of the main advantages of this regime is that the continuum often exhibits a high degree of temporal coherence, in addition it is possible to generate broad supercontinua in very short lengths of PCF. Disadvantages include an inability to scale to very high average powers in the continuum, although the limiting factor here is the available pump sources; and typically the spectrum is not smooth due to the localised nature of the spectral components which generate it.

Whether this regime is dominant can be worked out from the pulse and fibre parameters. We can define a soliton fission length, $L_{\mathrm{fiss}}$, to estimate the length at which the highest soliton compression is achieved, such that:

$$L_{\mathrm{fiss}}=\frac{L_D}{N}=\sqrt{\frac{\tau^2_0}{|\beta_2|\gamma P_0}}$$

where $L_D$ is the characteristic dispersion length and $N$ is the soliton order. As fission tends to occur at this length then provided that $L_{\mathrm{fiss}}$ is shorter than the length of the fibre and other characteristic length scales such as the modulation instability length $L_{\mathrm{MI}}$, fission will dominate.

=== Modulation instability regime ===
Modulation instability (MI) leads to the breakup of a continuous wave (CW) or quasi-continuous wave fields, which becomes a train of fundamental solitons.

The solitons generated in this regime are fundamental, as several papers on CW and quasi-CW supercontinuum formation have accredited short wavelength generation to soliton fission and dispersive wave generation as described above. In a similar manner to the soliton fission regime, the long wavelength side of the continuum is generated by the solitons undergoing intra-pulse Raman scattering and self-frequency shifting to longer wavelengths. As the MI process is noise driven, a distribution of solitons with different energies are created, resulting in different rates of self-frequency shifting. The net result is that MI driven soliton-Raman continua tends to be spectrally much smoother than those generated in the fission regime. Short wavelength generation is driven by four-wave mixing, especially for higher peak powers in the quasi-CW regime. In the pure CW regime, short wavelength generation has only recently been achieved at wavelengths shorter than those of a 1 μm pump source. In this case soliton trapping has been shown to play a role in short wavelength generation in the MI driven regime.

A continuum will only occur in the MI regime if the fibre and field parameters are such that MI forms and dominates over other processes such as fission. In a similar fashion to the fission regime it is constructive to develop a characteristic length scale for MI, $L_{\mathrm{MI}}$:

$$L_{\mathrm{MI}}=\frac{n_{\mathrm{dB}}}{20\gamma P_0\lg10}\sim\frac{4}{\gamma P_0}$$

where $n_{\mathrm{dB}}$ is the level of the background noise below the peak power level. Equation is essentially a measure of the length required for the MI gain to amplify the background quantum noise into solitons. Typically this shot noise is taken to be ~200 dB down. So provided $L_{\mathrm{MI}} \ll L_{\mathrm{fiss}}$ then MI will dominate over soliton fission in the quasi-CW case and this condition may be expressed as:

$$4^2\ll\frac{\gamma P_0\tau_0^2}{|\beta_2|}=N^2$$

The middle term of the equation is simply the soliton equation. For MI to dominate we need the left hand side to be much less than the right hand side which implies that the soliton order must be much greater than 4. In practice this boundary has been established as being approximately $N=16$. Therefore, we can see that it is predominantly ultra-short pulses that lead to the soliton fission mechanism.

=== Pumping in the normal dispersion regime ===
The two regimes outlined above assume that the pump is in the anomalous dispersion region. It is possible to create supercontinua in the normal region and in fact many of the early results discussed in the historical overview were pumped in the normal dispersion regime. If the input pulses are short enough then self-phase modulation can lead to significant broadening which is temporally coherent. However, if the pulses are not ultra-short then stimulated-Raman scattering tends to dominate and typically a series of cascaded discrete Stokes lines will appear until the zero-dispersion wavelength is reached. At this point a soliton Raman continuum may form. As pumping in the anomalous is much more efficient for continuum generation, the majority of modern sources avoiding pumping in the normal dispersion regime.
