= FOSA =

The acronym FOSA can refer to:

- Friends of South Asia, a South Asian American activist group
- Perfluorooctanesulfonamide, a synthetic chemical compound that is also abbreviated PFOSA
- Fiber Optic Sensing Association, a non-profit industry association that promotes fiber-optic sensing technology.
