= Photonic-crystal fiber =

Class of optical fiber based on the properties of photonic crystals

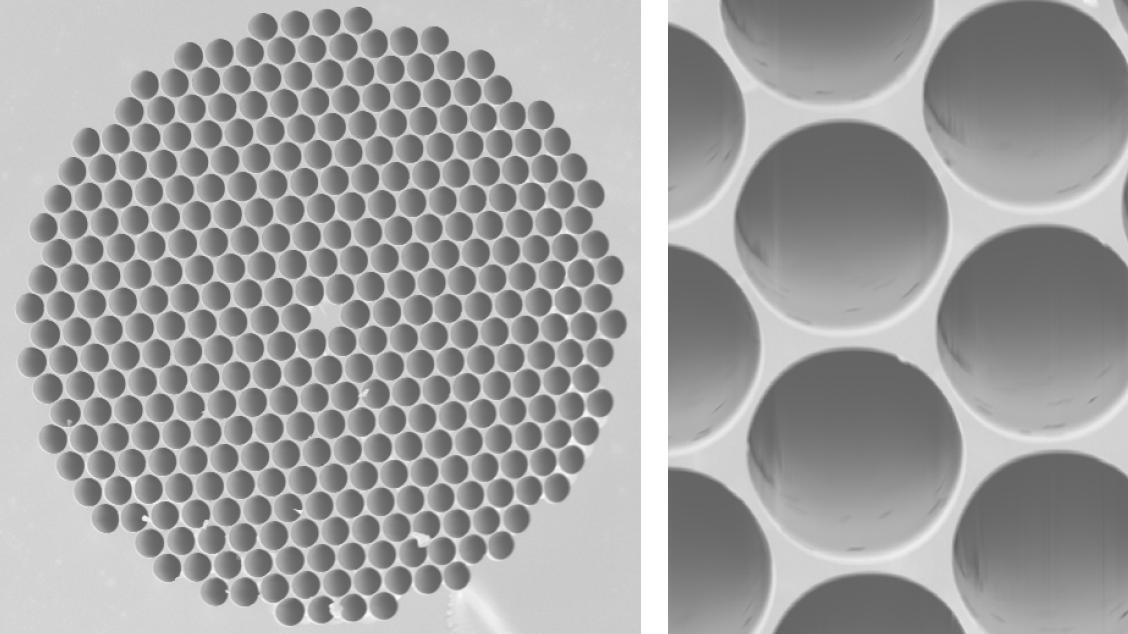
SEM micrographs of a photonic-crystal fiber produced at US Naval Research Laboratory. (left) The diameter of the solid core at the center of the fiber is 5 μm, while (right) the diameter of the holes is 4 μm

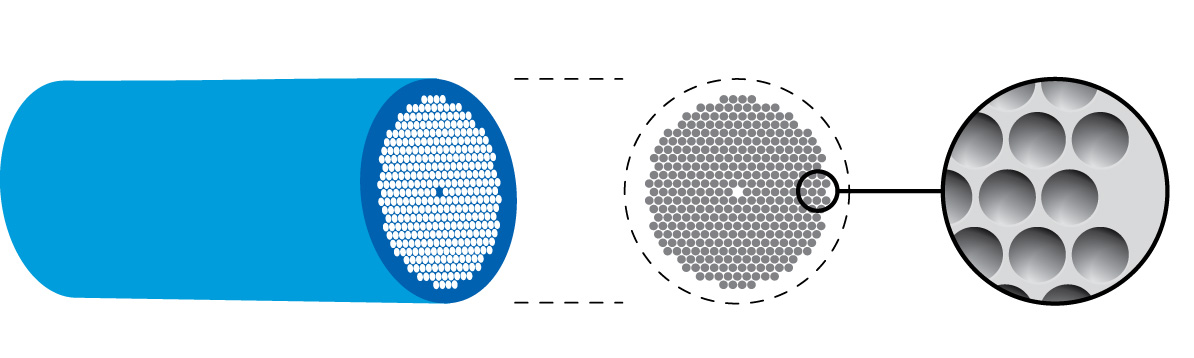
Diagram of a photonic crystal fiber in perspective and cross-sectional views. A solid-core fiber is shown with a periodic air hole cladding and a solid blue coating.

Photonic-crystal fiber (PCF) is a class of optical fiber based on the properties of photonic crystals. It was first explored in 1996 at University of Bath, UK. Because of its ability to confine light in hollow cores or with confinement characteristics not possible in conventional optical fiber, PCF is now finding applications in fiber-optic communications, fiber lasers, nonlinear devices, high-power transmission, highly sensitive gas sensors, and other areas. More specific categories of PCF include photonic-bandgap fiber (PCFs that confine light by band gap effects), holey fiber (PCFs using air holes in their cross-sections), hole-assisted fiber (PCFs guiding light by a conventional higher-index core modified by the presence of air holes), and Bragg fiber (photonic-bandgap fiber formed by concentric rings of multilayer film). Photonic crystal fibers may be considered a subgroup of a more general class of microstructured optical fibers, where light is guided by structural modifications, and not only by refractive index differences. Hollow-core fibers (HCFs) are a related type of optical fiber which bears some resemblance to holey optical fiber, but may or may not be photonic depending on the fiber.

== Description ==
Optical fibers have evolved into many forms since the practical breakthroughs that saw their wider introduction in the 1970s as conventional step index fibers and later as single material fibers where propagation was defined by an effective air cladding structure.

In general, regular structured fibers such as photonic crystal fibers, have a cross-section (normally uniform along the fiber length) consisting of one, two or more materials, most commonly arranged periodically over much of the cross-section. This zone is known as the "cladding" and surrounds a core (or several cores) where light is confined. For example, the fibers first demonstrated by Philip Russell consisted of a hexagonal lattice of air holes in a silica fiber, with a solid or hollow core at the center where light is guided. Other arrangements include concentric rings of two or more materials, first proposed as "Bragg fibers" by Yeh and Yariv, bow-tie, panda, and elliptical hole structures (used to achieve higher birefringence due to irregularity in the relative refractive index), spiral designs which allow for better control over optical properties as individual parameters can be changed.

(Note: PCFs and, in particular, Bragg fibers, should not be confused with fiber Bragg gratings, which consist of a periodic refractive index or structural variation along the fiber axis, as opposed to variations in the transverse directions as in PCF. Both PCFs and fiber Bragg gratings employ Bragg diffraction phenomena, albeit in different directions.)

The lowest reported attenuation of solid core photonic crystal fiber is 0.37 dB/km, and for hollow core is 1.2 dB/km.

== Construction ==
Generally, such fibers are constructed by the same methods as other optical fibers: first, one constructs a "preform" on the scale of centimeters in size, and then heats the preform and draws it down to a much smaller diameter (often nearly as small as a human hair), shrinking the preform cross section but (usually) maintaining the same features. In this way, kilometers of fiber can be produced from a single preform. Air holes are most commonly created by gathering hollow rods into a bundle, and heating the bundle to fuse it into a single rod with ordered holes before drawing, although drilling/milling was used to produce the first aperiodic designs. This formed the subsequent basis for producing the first soft glass and polymer structured fibers.

Most photonic crystal fibers have been fabricated in silica glass, but other glasses have also been used to obtain particular optical properties (such as high optical non-linearity). There is also a growing interest in making them from polymer, where a wide variety of structures have been explored, including graded index structures, ring structured fibers and hollow core fibers. These polymer fibers have been termed "MPOF", short for microstructured polymer optical fibers. A combination of a polymer and a chalcogenide glass was used by Temelkuran et al. in 2002 for 10.6 μm wavelengths (where silica is not transparent).

== Modes of operation ==
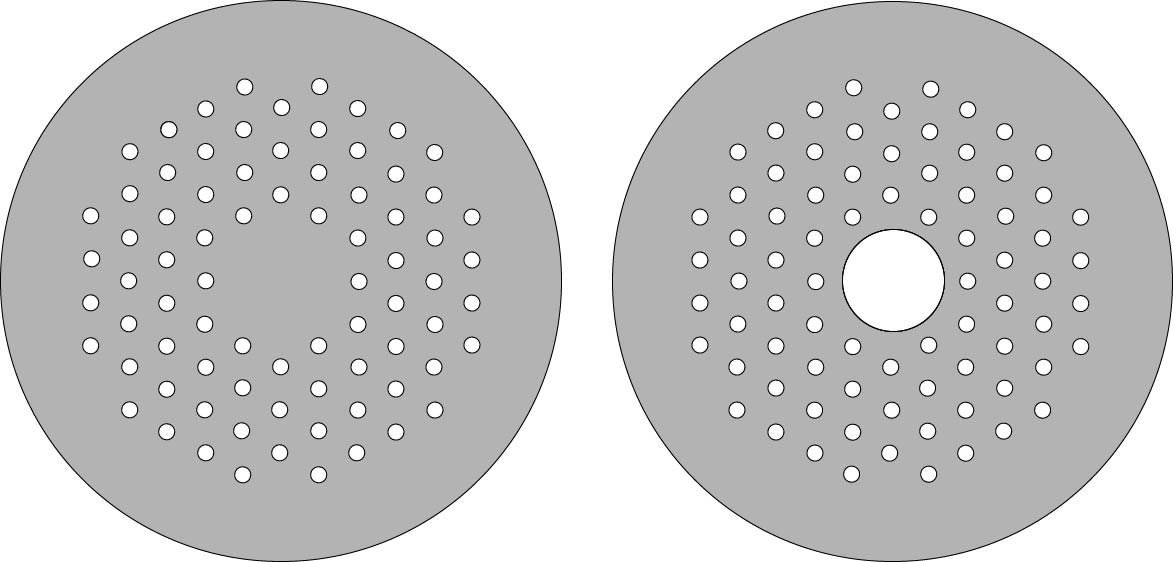
Diagram in cross-sectional view of two types of photonic crystal fibers: index guide (left) and photonic bandgap (right).

Photonic crystal fibers can be divided into two modes of operation, according to their mechanism for confinement: index guiding and photonic bandgap.

Index guiding photonic crystal fibers are characterized by a core with a higher average refractive index than that of the cladding. The simplest way to accomplish this is to maintain a solid core, surrounded by a cladding region of the same material but interspersed with air holes, as the refractive index of the air will necessarily lower the average refractive index of the cladding. These photonic crystal fibers operate on the same index-guiding principle as conventional optical fiber—however, they can have a much higher effective refractive index contrast between core and cladding, and therefore can have much stronger confinement for applications in nonlinear optical devices, polarization-maintaining fibers. Alternatively, they can also be made with much lower effective index contrast.

Alternatively, one can create a photonic bandgap photonic crystal fiber, in which the light is confined by a photonic bandgap created by the microstructured cladding—such a bandgap, properly designed, can confine light in a lower-index core and even a hollow (air) core. Bandgap fibers with hollow cores can potentially circumvent limits imposed by available materials, for example to create fibers that guide light in wavelengths for which transparent materials are not available (because the light is primarily in the air, not in the solid materials). Another potential advantage of a hollow core is that one can dynamically introduce materials into the core, such as a gas that is to be analyzed for the presence of some substance. PCF can also be modified by coating the holes with sol-gels of similar or different index material to enhance the transmittance of light.

== History ==
The term "photonic-crystal fiber" was coined by Philip Russell in 1995–1997 (he states (2003) that the idea dates to unpublished work in 1991).

== See also ==
- Fiber Bragg grating
- Fiber optics
- Gradient index optics
- Leaky mode
- Optical communication
- Optical medium
- Photonic crystal
- Subwavelength-diameter optical fiber
