= Giok Djan Khoe =

Indonesian photonics scientist (born 1946)

Djan (Giok Djan) Khoe (born 22 July 1946) is a photonic scientist and Professor Emeritus at the Eindhoven University of Technology, The Netherlands.

== Career ==
Khoe was born in Magelang, Central Java, Indonesia. He received a master's degree in electrical engineering, cum laude, from the Eindhoven University of Technology in Eindhoven, The Netherlands, in 1971. His graduation thesis described a novel method for measuring the properties of turbulent air and was published in the Proceedings of the IEEE. He started research at the Dutch Foundation for Fundamental Research on Matter (FOM) Laboratory on Plasma Physics, Rijnhuizen. In 1973, he moved to Philips Research Laboratories in Eindhoven working in the area of optical fiber communication systems and components. In 1983 he became part time professor at Eindhoven University of Technology. He became a full professor at the same university in 1994 and served as chairman of the Department of Telecommunication Technology and Electromagnetics (TTE) until 2008.

His publications and patents describe photonic communication systems and photonic devices. Together with Philips, his group achieved a record bit rate of 10 Gbit/s over 420 km single mode silica fiber using 1300 nm wavelength. Together with Yasuhiro Koike, a polymer scientist at Keio University, he pioneered in high transmission speed over graded index polymer optical fibers (GIPOF), a form of Plastic Optical Fiber. They demonstrated that Gigabit transmission is possible as well as transmission with multiple wavelengths and achieved a record bit rate of 2.5 Gbit/s in 1999.

He is Life Fellow of the Institute of Electronic and Electrical Engineers (IEEE), Fellow of the Optica Society (formerly Optical Society of America) and Officer of the Order of Orange-Nassau, a Dutch Royal Honour. He was President of the IEEE Photonics Society in 2003, a recipient of the IEEE Photonic Society Distinguished Services Award in 2009, and the 1997 MOC/GRIN award.

== Awards and recognition ==
- 1991: Fellow of the IEEE (Institute of the Electrical and Electronics Engineers) for contributions in Single Mode Fibre Systems and Devices.
- 1997: MOC/GRIN Award for contributions in micro-optics and gradient index optical systems.
- 2000: Invited author, Millennium Issue, IEEE Journal of Selected Topics in Quantum Electronics, vol.6, pp.1265–1272.
- 2003: President, IEEE Photonics Society.
- 2006: Fellow of the OSA (Optical Society of America) for sustained contributions in Photonic Systems and Academic Leadership.
- 2009: IEEE Photonics Society Distinguished Services Award for exemplary vision and leadership enabling sustained growth and broadened involvement of Photonics Society, particularly student members and international activities.
- 2011: Officer in the Order of Orange-Nassau, a Dutch Royal Honour for outstanding service of national and international importance.
- 2012: IEEE Life Fellow.

== Books ==
- R. Van Santen, G.D. (Djan) Khoe, and B Vermeer. 2030: Technology that will change the World. Oxford University Press, 2010. Translated into Arabic, Chinese, Indonesian, and Korean.
