= Long-period fiber grating =

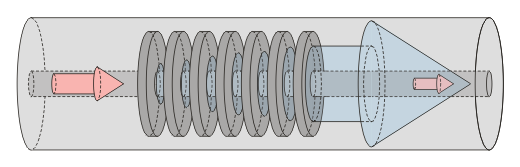

A long-period fiber grating couples light from a guided mode into forward propagating cladding modes where it is lost due to absorption and scattering. The coupling from the guided mode to cladding modes is wavelength dependent so we can obtain a spectrally selective loss. It is an optical fiber structure with the properties periodically varying along the fiber, such that the conditions for the interaction of several copropagating modes are satisfied. The period of such a structure is of the order of a fraction of a millimeter. In contrast to the fiber Bragg gratings, LPFGs couple copropagating modes with close propagation constants; therefore, the period of such a grating can considerably exceed the wavelength of radiation propagating in the fiber. Because the period of an LPFG is much larger than the wavelength, LPFGs are relatively simple to manufacture. Since LPFGs couple copropagating modes, their resonances can only be observed in transmission spectra. The transmission spectrum has dips at the wavelengths corresponding to resonances with various cladding modes (in a single-mode fiber).

Depending on the symmetry of the perturbation that is used to write the LPFG, modes of different symmetries may be coupled. For instance, cylindrically symmetric gratings couple symmetric LP0m modes of the fiber. Microbend gratings, which are antisymmetric with respect to the fiber axis, create a resonance between the core mode and the asymmetric LP1m modes of the core and the cladding.

Long period grating has a wide variety of applications, including band-rejection filters, gain flattening filter and sensors.

Various gratings with complex structures have been designed: gratings combining several LPFGs, LPFGs with superstructures, chirped gratings, and gratings with apodization. Various LPFG-based devices have been developed: filters, sensors, fiber dispersion compensators, etc.
