= Hydrogen darkening =

Physical degradation of the optical properties of fiber-optic cables

Hydrogen darkening is a physical degradation of the optical properties of glass. Free hydrogen atoms are able to bind to the SiO_{2} silica glass compound forming hydroxyl (OH)—a chemical compound that interferes with the passage of light through the glass.

The problem is particularly relevant to fiber-optic cables—particularly in oil and gas wells where fiber optic cables are used for distributed temperature sensing (DTS). Hydrogen can be present due to the cracking of hydrocarbons in the well. The darkening of the fiber can distort the DTS reading and possibly render the DTS system inoperable due to the optical loss budget being exceeded.

To prevent this, coatings such as carbon are applied to the fiber, and hydrogen capturing gels are used to buffer the fiber and other proprietary techniques may be used to prevent hydrogen atoms from reaching the glass fiber via the cable sheath.
