= Plastic optical fiber =

Optical fiber that is made out of polymer

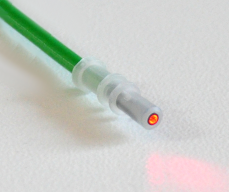

Plastic optical fiber (POF) or polymer optical fiber is optical fiber that is made out of polymer. Similar to glass optical fiber, POF transmits light (for illumination or data) through the core of the fiber. Its chief advantage over the glass product is its robustness under bending and stretching.

== History ==
DuPont created the first step index (SI) POF with a PMMA core in 1968. This was followed by Toray Industries, which developed an SI POF with a polystyrene (PS) core in 1972.

Due to the relatively high attenuation of POF compared to glass optical fiber, subsequent research efforts have been made universities and companies, including Keio University and Asahi Chemical focused on reducing attenuation. These efforts have led to the development of PMMA-core POFs with attenuation values below 150 dB/km at a wavelength of 650 nm.

Giok Djan Khoe at Eindhoven University of Technology and Yasuhiro Koike, a polymer scientist at Keio University pioneered in high transmission speed over graded index polymer optical fibers (GIPOF), and set a world record of 2.5 Gbit/s in 1999. They demonstrated in 2001 that Gigabit transmission is possible as well as transmission with wavelength-division multiplexing. Transmission over single mode silica optical fiber is superior for the long distance, but GIPOF is attractive for shorter distances because it is much easier to handle, owing to the much larger diameter and the flexibility of the material.

Since 2014 a full family of PHY transceivers have been available in the market enabling the design and manufacturing of home networking equipment delivering Gigabit speeds into the home.

== Materials ==
Traditionally, PMMA (acrylic) comprises the core (96% of the cross section in a fiber 1mm in diameter), and fluorinated polymers are the cladding material. Since the late 1990s much higher performance graded-index (GI-POF) fiber based on amorphous fluoropolymer (poly(perfluoro-butenylvinyl ether), CYTOP) has begun to appear in the marketplace. Whereas glass fibers are only manufactured by drawing, polymer optical fibers can also be manufactured by extruding.

=== Characteristics of PMMA POF ===
- PMMA is used as the core, with a refractive index of 1.49.
- Generally, fiber cladding is made of fluorinated polymers (refractive index <1.40).
- High refractive index difference is maintained between core and cladding.
- High numerical aperture.
- Have high mechanical flexibility and low cost.
- Industry-standard (IEC 60793-2-40 A4a.2) step-index fiber has a core diameter of 1mm.
- Attenuation loss is about .1 dB/m @ 650 nm.
- Bandwidth is ~5 MHz-km @ 650 nm.

== Applications ==
=== Data networks ===
POF has been called the "consumer" optical fiber because the fiber and associated optical links, connectors, and installation are all inexpensive. Due to the attenuation and distortion characteristics of PMMA fibers, they are commonly used for low-speed, short-distance (up to 100 meters) applications in digital home appliances, home networks, industrial networks (PROFIBUS, PROFINET, Sercos, EtherCAT), and car networks (MOST). The perfluorinated polymer fibers are commonly used for much higher-speed applications such as data center wiring and building LAN wiring.

In relation to the future requirements of high-speed home networking, there has been an increasing interest in POF as a possible option for next-generation Gigabit/s links inside the home. To this end, several European Research projects are active, such as POF-ALL and POF-PLUS .

=== Sensors ===
Polymer optical fibers can be used for remote sensing and multiplexing due to their low cost and high resistance.

It is possible to write fiber Bragg gratings in single and multimode POF. There are advantages in doing this over using silica fiber since the POF can be stretched further without breaking, some applications are described in the PHOSFOS project page.

=== Illumination ===
POFs are used in lighting applications for both industrial and consumer purposes, as they offer advantages such as lower heat generation and reduced energy consumption, and improved safety in electrically hazardous environments.

The two main types of POFs used for commercial lighting are end-emitting POF (EEPOF) and side-emitting POF (SEPOF), which emit light from the fiber end and along the fiber length, respectively. Twisting the fiber has been shown to enhance side emission by creating perturbations that disrupts total internal reflection, allowing light to escape along the fiber length rather than at the end, and can increase flexibility in fiber bundles. This depends on factors such as the number of bundled strands, their elastic modulus, and the twisting angle.

== Standards ==
Optical fiber used in telecommunications is governed by European Standards EN 60793-2-40-2011.

Several standardization bodies at country, European, and worldwide levels are currently developing Gigabit communication standards for POF aimed towards home networking applications. It is expected the release at the beginning of 2012.

An IEEE study group and later task force has been meeting since then until the publication on 2017 of the IEEE802.3bv Amendment. IEEE 802.3bv defines a 1 Gigabit/s full duplex transmission over SI-POF using red LED. It is called 1000BASE-RH.

This Gigabit POF IEEE standard is based on multilevel PAM modulation a frame structure, Tomlinson-Harashima Precoding and Multilevel coset coding modulation. The combination of all these techniques has proven to be an efficient way of achieving low-cost implementations at the same time that the transmission theoretical maximum capacity of the POF is approached.

Other alternatives are schemes like DMT, PAM-2 NRZ, DFE equalization or PAM-4. VDE standard was published in 2013. After the publication the IEEE asked VDE to withdraw the specification and bring all the effort to IEEE. VDE withdrew the specification and a CFI was presented to IEEE in March 2014.

== Literature ==
- C.M.Okonkwo, E. Tangdiongga, H. Yang, D. Visani, S. Loquai, R. Kruglov, B. Charbonnier, M. Ouzzif, I. Greiss, O. Ziemann, R. Gaudino, A. M. J. Koonen, "Recent Results From the EU POF-PLUS Project: Multi-Gigabit Transmission Over 1 mm Core Diameter Plastic Optical Fibers", Journal of Lightwave Technology, Vol. 29., No.2., pp186–193 January 2011.
- Ziemann, O., Krauser, J., Zamzow, P.E., Daum, W.: POF Handbook - Optical Short Range Transmission Systems. 2nd ed., 2008, Springer, 884 p. 491 illus. in color, ISBN 978-3-540-76628-5
- I. Möllers, D. Jäger, R. Gaudino, A. Nocivelli, H. Kragl, O. Ziemann, N. Weber, T. Koonen, C. Lezzi, A. Bluschke, S. Randel, “Plastic Optical Fiber Technology for Reliable Home Networking – Overview and Results of the EU Project POF-ALL,” IEEE Communications Magazine, Optical Communications Series, Vol.47, No.8, pp. 58–68, August 2009
- R. Pérez de Aranda, O. Ciordia, C. Pardo, “A standard for Gigabit Ethernet over POF. Product Implementation”, Proc. of POF Conference 2011. Bilbao
- S. Randel, C. Bunge, “Spectrally Efficient Polymer Optical Fiber Transmission”, Coherent Optical Communications, Subsystems and Systems, Proc. SPIE Vol. 7960
- J. Lee, "Discrete Multitone Modulation for Short-Range Optical Communications," PhD Thesis, University of Technology Eindhoven, 2009. Link.
