= Distributed acoustic sensing =

Type of sensor

Rayleigh scattering-based distributed acoustic sensing (DAS) systems use fiber optic cables to provide distributed strain sensing. In DAS, the optical fiber cable becomes the sensing element and measurements are made, and in part processed, using an attached optoelectronic device. Such a system allows acoustic frequency strain signals to be detected over large distances and in harsh environments.

== Fundamentals of Rayleigh scatter-based fiber optic sensing ==
In Rayleigh scatter-based distributed fiber optic sensing, a coherent laser pulse is sent along an optic fiber, and scattering sites within the fiber cause the fiber to act as a distributed interferometer with a gauge length, the spatial interval over which the average axial strain or strain rate is measured, approximately equal to the pulse length. The intensity of the reflected light is measured as a function of time after transmission of the laser pulse. This is known as coherent Rayleigh optical time domain reflectometry (COTDR). When the pulse has had time to travel the full length of the fiber and back, the next laser pulse can be sent along the fiber. Changes in the reflected intensity of successive pulses from the same region of fiber are caused by changes in the optical path length of that section of fiber. This type of system is very sensitive to both strain and temperature variations of the fiber and measurements can be made almost simultaneously at all sections of the fiber.

== Capabilities of Rayleigh-based systems ==
=== Maximum range ===
The optical pulse is attenuated as it propagates along the fiber. For a single mode fiber operating at 1550 nm, a typical attenuation is 0.2 dB/km. Since the light must make a double pass along each section of fiber, this means each 1 km causes a total loss of 0.4 dB. The maximum range of the system occurs when the amplitude of the reflected pulse becomes so low it is impossible to obtain a clear signal from it. It is not possible to counteract this effect by increasing the input power because above a certain level this will induce nonlinear optical effects which will disrupt the operation of the system. Typically the maximum range that can be measured is around 40–50 km.

=== Strain resolution ===
The maximum value of strain that can be measured depends on the carrier to noise ratio of the returning optical signal. The carrier level is largely determined by the amplitude of the optical signal while the noise is a combination of that from a variety of sources including laser noise, electronic noise and detector noise.

=== Spatial resolution and spatial sampling period ===
The spatial resolution is mainly determined by the duration of the transmitted pulse, with a 100 ns pulse giving 10 m resolution being a typical value. The amount of reflected light is proportional to the pulse length so there is a trade-off between spatial resolution and maximum range. To improve the maximum range, it would be desirable to use a longer pulse length to increase the reflected light level but this leads to a smaller spatial resolution. In order for two signals to be independent, they must be obtained from two points on the fiber that are separated by at least the spatial resolution. It is possible to obtain samples at separations less than the spatial resolution and although this produces signals that are not independent of each other, such an approach does offer advantages in some applications. The separation between the sampling points is sometimes referred to as the spatial sampling period.

=== Acquisition rate ===
Before the next laser pulse can be transmitted the previous one must have had time to travel to the far end of the fiber and for the reflections from there to return, otherwise reflections would be returning from different sections of the fiber at the same time and the system would not operate properly. For a fiber 50 km long the maximum pulse rate is just over 2 kHz. Therefore, strains can be measured which vary at frequencies up to the Nyquist frequency of 1 kHz. Shorter fibers clearly enable higher acquisition rates.

=== Temperature measurements ===
Although the system is sensitive to both temperature and strain variations these can often be separated as those due to temperature tend to occur at a lower frequency range than strain. Unlike other distributed fiber techniques such as those based on Brillouin or Raman scatter, distributed acoustic sensing is only able to detect changes in temperature rather than its absolute value.

== Comparison with other fiber optic distributed sensing techniques ==
Distributed acoustic sensing relies on light which is Rayleigh backscattered from small variations in the refractive index of the fiber. The backscattered light has the same frequency as the transmitted light. There are a number of other distributed fiber sensing techniques that rely on different scattering mechanisms and can be used to measure other parameters.

Brillouin scatter occurs due to the interaction between the light and acoustic phonons travelling in the fiber. As the light is scattered by a moving phonon, its frequency is shifted by the Doppler effect by around 10 GHz. Light is generated at both above (anti-Stokes shift) and below (Stokes shift) the original optical frequency. The intensity and frequency shifts of the two components are dependent on both temperature and strain and by measuring the shifts, absolute values of the two parameters can be calculated using a distributed temperature and strain sensing (DTSS) system. Brillouin scatter is much weaker than Rayleigh scatter and so the reflections from a number of pulses must be summed together to enable the measurements to be made. Therefore, the maximum frequency at which changes can be measured using Brillouin scatter is typically a few tens of hertz.

Raman scatter occurs when light is scattered in interaction with molecular vibrations in the fiber. As with Brillouin scattering, both Stokes and anti-Stokes components are produced and these are shifted from the wavelength of the incident light by several tens of nanometers. By measuring the ratio in intensity between the Stokes and anti-Stokes components, an absolute value of temperature can be measured by a distributed temperature sensing (DTS) system. The larger wavelength shifts compared to Brillouin scatter mean that it is easier to separate the scattered Raman light from the un-shifted Rayleigh scattered component. However the intensity of the Raman scatter is lower than the Brillouin scatter and so it is normally necessary to average for many seconds or minutes in order to get reasonable results. Therefore, Raman-based systems are only suitable for measuring slowly varying temperatures.

=== Phase-sensitive coherent optical time-domain reflectometry ===
Phase-sensitive coherent optical time-domain reflectometry (Φ-OTDR) is a technique that can provide sufficient sensitivity and resolution for these distributed acoustic sensing systems. Standard optical time-domain reflectometry techniques use light sources with coherence lengths, which are shorter than pulse lengths. This can yield a sum of backscattered intensities from each scattering center, which allows monitoring splices and breaks in fiber optic cables. On the contrary, in Φ-OTDR-based sensors, the coherence length of lasers is longer than their pulse length. An event near the fiber generates an acoustic wave that affects the optical fiber by changing the phases of the backscattering centers. An analysis of such signals can reveal their impact on the sensor and monitor acoustic sources located near fiber objects.

== Applications ==
The sensitivity and speed of Rayleigh-based sensing allows distributed monitoring of acoustic signals over distances of more than 100 km from each laser source. Typical applications include continuous monitoring of pipelines for unwanted interference and for leaks or flow irregularities; monitoring of power cables for unwanted interference and cable faults; monitoring traffic (roads, railways and trains), borders, and other sensitive perimeters for unusual activity; and even oil well monitoring applications where the technology allows the state of the well all along its length to be determined in real-time. The ability of the optic fiber to operate in harsh environments makes the technology especially well suited for scenarios in which typical sensing systems are unusable or impractical due to environmental conditions. The long range of the technology also allows its use in seismic sensing. One cable can provide a continuous line of regional seismic activity monitoring, and also detect earthquakes thousands of kilometers away. The use of distributed acoustic sensing has also been demonstrated to monitor hydraulic stimulation in enhanced geothermal systems (EGS) as well as the injection of carbon dioxide in several carbon capture and storage (CCS) projects.

== See also ==
- Distributed temperature sensing
- Fiber optic sensor
- Optical time-domain reflectometer
