= Fiber Optic Sensing Association =

Non-profit industry association promoting fiber-optic technology

- Abbreviation: FOSA
- Established: April 24, 2017; 9 years ago
- Founded at: Washington, D.C.
- Type: Nonprofit industry association
- Purpose: Promoting fiber-optic sensing technology
- Members: 21
- Board of directors: Paul Dickinson (chairman)
- Affiliations: Fiber Broadband Association
- Website: www.fiberopticsensing.org/about-fosa

The Fiber Optic Sensing Association (FOSA) is a nonprofit industry association that promotes fiber-optic sensing technology. It was founded in April 2017 in Washington, D.C. and has a membership of 21 companies and universities.

== Background and structure ==
The Fiber Optic Sensing Association was founded on April 24, 2017. It had nearly a dozen founding member companies representing an "eclectic" group, including Corning Inc. and OFS, across the United States, Japan, the United Kingdom, and Switzerland. The agenda for the first meeting of FOSA focused on promoting fiber-optic sensing technology through infrastructure priorities including smart highways and implementation into larger construction projects.

FOSA is affiliated with the Fiber Broadband Association (FBA), which promotes fiber-optic networking technology. Its current Chairman is Paul Dickinson of Dura-Line. Previous Chairmen include Dave Cunningham of Network Integrity Solutions, Mike Hines of OFS, and Kent Wardley of Fotech Solutions.

== Research ==
A December 2017 study from FOSA found that China had the most distributed fiber-optic sensing installations in the world, followed by Germany, the United States, and South Korea. In August 2018, the organization launched a report advocating the use of fiber-optic sensing technology in railways to improve security. It has also supported implementation of fiber-optic sensing technology in the pipeline industry to monitor leaks, tampering, and hazardous conditions.

FOSA supported the Smart Cities and Communities Act, introduced by Representatives Suzan DelBene and Yvette Clarke. The bill would provide $1.1 billion to expand the use of smart city technology. It also supported Federal Highway Administration "dig once" policies. Along with other industry associations, FOSA supported the Community Broadband Act, which would eliminate state laws that restrict the ability of local government to create broadband networks, introduced by Representative Anna Eshoo and Senator Cory Booker.

== Members ==
As of March 2024, FOSA claims 21 members:

- AP Sensing
- Corning Inc.
- Ditch Witch
- Dura-Line Corporation
- Exail
- FBGS Technologies GmbH
- FEBUS Optics
- Hifi Engineering
- Institute of Engineering Geodesy and Measurement Systems, Graz University of Technology
- Luna Innovations (LIOS, OptaSense, Silixa)
- NEC Corporation of America
- Network Integrity Systems
- OFS
- OZ Optics
- Prysmian Group
- Samm Teknoloji
- Sensonic
- Smartpipe Technologies
- Underline
- University of California, Berkeley
- Viavi Solutions
