= Jonas F. Ludvigsson =

Swedish physician and epidemiologist

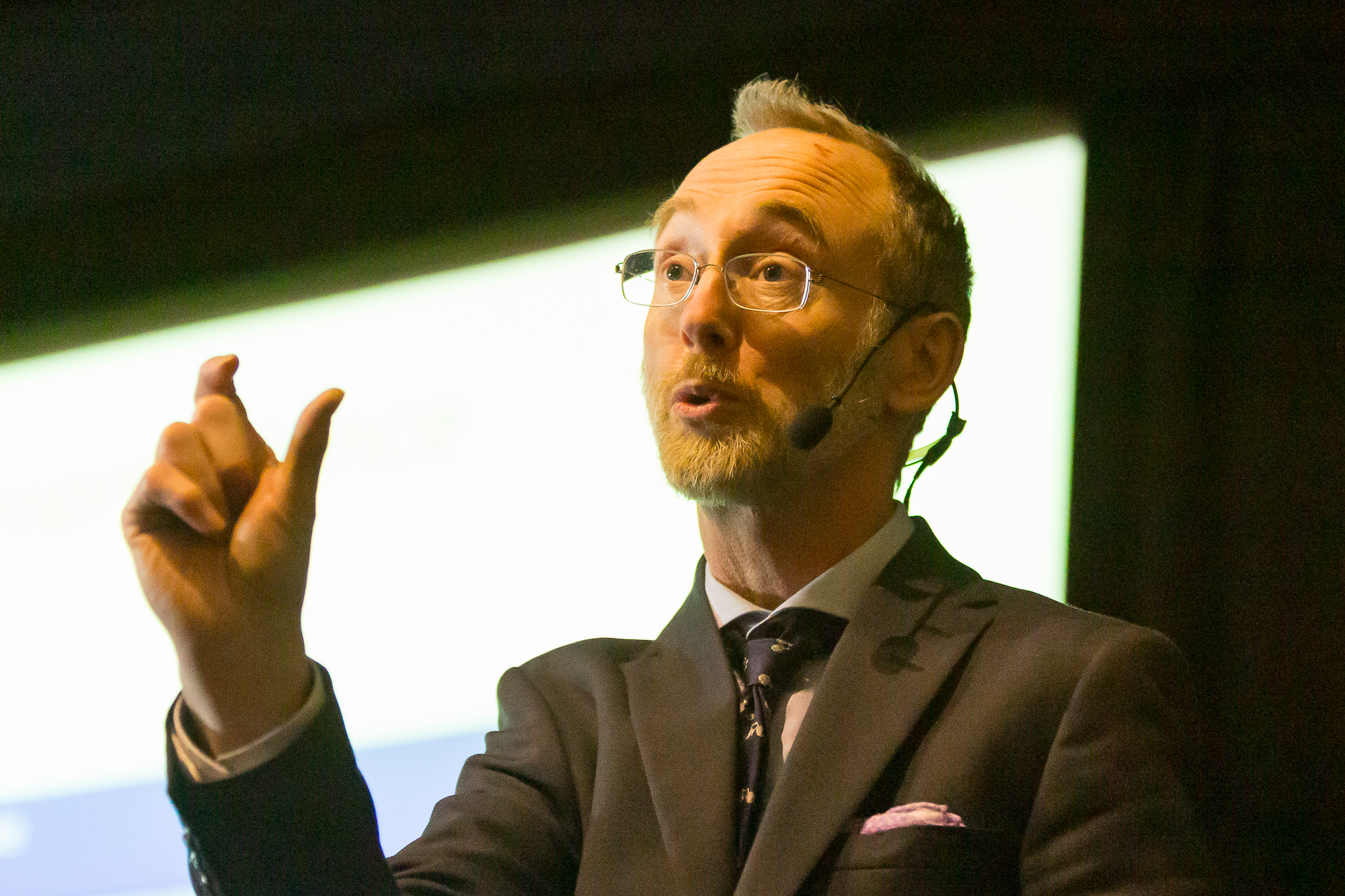
Jonas F. Ludvigsson in 2019

Jonas Filip Ludvigsson is a Swedish physician and epidemiologist. He is a professor at the Department of Medical Epidemiology and Biostatistics at Karolinska Institutet, Sweden, and a senior paediatrician in the Department of Pediatrics at Örebro University Hospital, Sweden. Ludvigsson is known for being one of the 47 initial signees of the Great Barrington Declaration.

== Biography ==
Jonas Ludvigsson was born in Sweden. He studied medicine at Linköping University, in Sweden, where he received his M.D. in 1995, and defended his PhD thesis - Some epidemiological aspects of perinatal gastrointestinal disease - in 2001 (Medicine).

Ludvigsson became a professor at the Karolinska Institutet, in 2013. Since then, he has conducted extensive epidemiological research in the field of gastroenterology, focusing on, among other things, celiac disease, inflammatory bowel disease, microscopic colitis, and liver disease. Moreover, he has performed extensive research in paediatrics. He is an Honorary Professor at the Columbia University School of Medicine in New York, NY, and, previously, also at the Nottingham University School of Medicine, in the UK.

Between 2015 and 2017, Ludvigsson initiated and led a nationwide effort to collect data on all biopsies from the gastrointestinal tract taken in Sweden from 1967 to 2017. This histopathology data constitutes the foundation for the ESPRESSO study (Epidemiology Strengthened by histoPathology Reports in Sweden).

Ludvigsson also serves as a member of the steering group of the Swedish Inflammatory Bowel Disease Register (Swibreg). Between 2011 and 2014, Ludvigsson chaired the Swedish Epidemiological Association. and in 2014, he was elected to serve as chairman of the Swedish Society of Pediatrics (2014–2016). In June 2023, he assumed the position of scientific secretary at the Swedish Medical Society

Ludvigsson has received numerous awards for his epidemiological research and leadership. He was named the 2010 "Rising Star in Gastroenterology" by the European Gastroenterology Association, and he also received the award for the 2013 Alumnus of the year, from Linköping University. Ludvigsson also serves as an active member of the Editorial Boards of both the European Journal of Epidemiology and Alimentary, Pharmacology & Therapeutics. Beginning in 2019, he was named the staff pediatrician at the Swedish Television station, TV4. In 2022, Ludvigsson was awarded the prestigious Jubilee-prize from the Swedish Medical Society in recognition of his research on chronic viral hepatitis where he could show that use of aspirin is associated with a reduced risk of liver cancer. Moreover, in 2023, with the motivation: “For his amazing talent to explain important pediatric research to the public and to healthcare staff.” he also received the Hugo Lagercrantz award He has also been named "Örebro-person of the year by the readers of the Swedish daily Nerikes Allehanda.
