= Fiber-optic sensor =

Sensor that uses optical fiber

A fiber-optic sensor is a sensor that uses optical fiber either as the sensing element ("intrinsic sensors"), or as a means of relaying signals from a remote sensor to the electronics that process the signals ("extrinsic sensors"). Fibers have many uses in remote sensing. Depending on the application, fiber may be used because of its small size, or because no electrical power is needed at the remote location, or because many sensors can be multiplexed along the length of a fiber by using light wavelength shift for each sensor, or by sensing the time delay as light passes along the fiber through each sensor. Time delay can be determined using a device such as an optical time-domain reflectometer and wavelength shift can be calculated using an instrument implementing optical frequency domain reflectometry.

Fiber-optic sensors are also immune to electromagnetic interference, and do not conduct electricity so they can be used in places where there is high voltage electricity or flammable material such as jet fuel. Fiber-optic sensors can be designed to withstand high temperatures as well.

== Intrinsic sensors ==
Optical fibers can be used as sensors to measure strain, temperature, pressure and other quantities by modifying a fiber so that the quantity to be measured modulates the intensity, phase, polarization, wavelength or transit time of light in the fiber. Sensors that vary the intensity of light are the simplest, since only a simple source and detector are required. A particularly useful feature of intrinsic fiber-optic sensors is that they can, if required, provide distributed sensing over very large distances.

Temperature can be measured by using a fiber that has evanescent loss that varies with temperature, or by analyzing the Rayleigh Scattering, Raman scattering or the Brillouin scattering in the optical fiber. Electrical voltage can be sensed by nonlinear optical effects in specially-doped fiber, which alter the polarization of light as a function of voltage or electric field. Angle measurement sensors can be based on the Sagnac effect.

Special fibers like long-period fiber grating (LPG) optical fibers can be used for direction recognition . Photonics Research Group of Aston University in UK has some publications on vectorial bend sensor applications.

Optical fibers are used as hydrophones for seismic and sonar applications. Hydrophone systems with more than one hundred sensors per fiber cable have been developed. Hydrophone sensor systems are used by the oil industry as well as a few countries' navies. Both bottom-mounted hydrophone arrays and towed streamer systems are in use. The German company Sennheiser developed a laser microphone for use with optical fibers.

A fiber-optic microphone and fiber-optic based headphone are useful in areas with strong electrical or magnetic fields, such as communication amongst the team of people working on a patient inside a magnetic resonance imaging (MRI) machine during MRI-guided surgery.

Optical fiber sensors for temperature and pressure have been developed for downhole measurement in oil wells. The fiber-optic sensor is well suited for this environment as it functions at temperatures too high for semiconductor sensors (distributed temperature sensing).

Optical fibers can be made into interferometric sensors such as fiber-optic gyroscopes, which are used in the Boeing 767 and in some car models (for navigation purposes). They are also used to make hydrogen sensors.

Fiber-optic sensors have been developed to measure co-located temperature and strain simultaneously with very high accuracy using fiber Bragg gratings. This is particularly useful when acquiring information from small or complex structures. Fiber optic sensors are also particularly well suited for remote monitoring, and they can be interrogated 290 km away from the monitoring station using an optical fiber cable. Brillouin scattering effects can also be used to detect strain and temperature over large distances (20–120 kilometers).

=== Other examples ===
A fiber-optic AC/DC voltage sensor in the middle and high voltage range (100–2000 V) can be created by inducing measurable amounts of Kerr nonlinearity in single-mode optical fiber by exposing a calculated length of fiber to the external electric field. The measurement technique is based on polarimetric detection and high accuracy is achieved in a hostile industrial environment.

High frequency (5 MHz–1 GHz) electromagnetic fields can be detected by induced nonlinear effects in fiber with a suitable structure. The fiber used is designed such that the Faraday and Kerr effects cause considerable phase change in the presence of the external field. With appropriate sensor design, this type of fiber can be used to measure different electrical and magnetic quantities and different internal parameters of fiber material.

Electrical power can be measured in a fiber by using a structured bulk fiber ampere sensor coupled with proper signal processing in a polarimetric detection scheme. Experiments have been carried out in support of the technique.

Fiber-optic sensors are used in electrical switchgear to transmit light from an electrical arc flash to a digital protective relay to enable fast tripping of a breaker to reduce the energy in the arc blast.

Fiber Bragg grating based fiber-optic sensors significantly enhance performance, efficiency and safety in several industries. With FBG integrated technology, sensors can provide detailed analysis and comprehensive reports on insights with very high resolution. These types of sensors are used extensively in several industries like telecommunication, automotive, aerospace, energy, etc. Fiber Bragg gratings are sensitive to the static pressure, mechanical tension and compression and fiber temperature changes. The efficiency of fiber Bragg grating based fiber-optic sensors can be provided by means of central wavelength adjustment of light emitting source in accordance with the current Bragg gratings reflection spectra.

== Extrinsic sensors ==
Extrinsic fiber-optic sensors use an optical fiber cable, normally a multimode one, to transmit modulated light from either a non-fiber optical sensor, or an electronic sensor connected to an optical transmitter. A major benefit of extrinsic sensors is their ability to reach places which are otherwise inaccessible. An example is the measurement of temperature inside aircraft jet engines by using a fiber to transmit radiation into a radiation pyrometer located outside the engine. Extrinsic sensors can also be used in the same way to measure the internal temperature of electrical transformers, where the extreme electromagnetic fields present make other measurement techniques impossible.

Extrinsic fiber-optic sensors provide excellent protection of measurement signals against noise corruption. Unfortunately, many conventional sensors produce electrical output which must be converted into an optical signal for use with fiber. For example, in the case of a platinum resistance thermometer, the temperature changes are translated into resistance changes. The PRT must therefore have an electrical power supply. The modulated voltage level at the output of the PRT can then be injected into the optical fiber via the usual type of transmitter. This complicates the measurement process and means that low-voltage power cables must be routed to the transducer.

Extrinsic sensors are used to measure vibration, rotation, displacement, velocity, acceleration, torque, and temperature.

== Chemical sensors and biosensors ==
It is well-known the propagation of light in optical fiber is confined in the core of the fiber based on the total internal reflection (TIR) principle and near-zero propagation loss within the cladding, which is very important for the optical communication but limits its sensing applications due to the non-interaction of light with surroundings. Therefore, it is essential to exploit novel fiber-optic structures to disturb the light propagation, thereby enabling the interaction of the light with surroundings and constructing fiber-optic sensors. Until now, several methods, including polishing, chemical etching, tapering, bending, as well as femtosecond grating inscription, have been proposed to tailor the light propagation and prompt the interaction of light with sensing materials. In the above-mentioned fiber-optic structures, the enhanced evanescent fields can be efficiently excited to induce the light to expose to and interact with the surrounding medium. However, the fibers themselves can only sense very few kinds of analytes with low-sensitivity and zero-selectivity, which greatly limits their development and applications, especially for biosensors that require both high-sensitivity and high-selectivity. To overcome the issue, an efficient way is to resort to responsive materials, which possess the ability to change their properties, such as RI, absorption, conductivity, etc., once the surrounding environments change. Due to the rapid progress of functional materials in recent years, various sensing materials are available for fiber-optic chemical sensors and biosensors fabrication, including graphene, metals and metal oxides, carbon nanotubes, nanowires, nanoparticles, polymers, quantum dots, etc. Generally, these materials reversibly change their shape/volume upon stimulation by the surrounding environments (the target analysts), which then leads to the variation of RI or absorption of the sensing materials. Consequently, the surrounding changes will be recorded and interrogated by the optical fibers, realizing sensing functions of optical fibers. Currently, various fiber-optic chemical sensors and biosensors have been proposed and demonstrated.

== See also ==
- Distributed acoustic sensing
- Fiber Optic Sensing Association
