= Malcolm Ludvigsen =

British painter

Malcolm Ludvigsen (born 14 February 1946) is a British mathematician and plein air painter. He is a former research fellow and visiting lecturer in mathematics at the University of York and the author of a book on general relativity. Many of his paintings depict the beaches of the Yorkshire coast.
