= Microbend gratings =

Microbend grating is a convenient method to couple light from one guided transverse mode into another. Due to its antisymmetric nature of perturbation, it can be used to couple only into antisymmetric modes. Microbend gratings are easily tunable for a wide range of wavelengths.
