= Distributed temperature sensing =

Optoelectronic temperature sensing device

Distributed temperature sensing systems (DTS) are optoelectronic devices which measure temperatures by means of optical fibres functioning as linear sensors. Temperatures are recorded along the optical sensor cable, thus not at points, but as a continuous profile. A high accuracy of temperature determination is achieved over great distances. Typically the DTS systems can locate the temperature to a spatial resolution of 1 m with accuracy to within ±1 °C at a resolution of 0.01 °C. Measurement distances of greater than 30 km can be monitored and some specialised systems can provide even tighter spatial resolutions. Thermal changes along the optical fibre cause a local variation in the refractive index, which in turn leads to the inelastic scattering of the light propagating through it. Heat is held in the form of molecular or lattice vibrations in the material. Molecular vibrations at high frequencies (10 THz) are responsible for Raman scattering. Low frequency vibrations (10–30 GHz) cause Brillouin scattering. Energy is exchanged between the light travelling through the fibre and the material itself and cause a frequency shift in the incident light. This frequency shift can then be used to measure temperature changes along the fibre.

== Measuring principle—Raman effect ==
Physical measurement dimensions, such as temperature or pressure and tensile forces, can affect glass fibres and locally change the characteristics of light transmission in the fibre. As a result of the damping of the light in the quartz glass fibres through scattering, the location of an external physical effect can be determined so that the optical fibre can be employed as a linear sensor.

Optical fibres are made from doped quartz glass. Quartz glass is a form of silicon dioxide (SiO_{2}) with amorphous solid structure. Thermal effects induce lattice oscillations within the solid. When light falls onto these thermally excited molecular oscillations, an interaction occurs between the light particles (photons) and the electrons of the molecule. Light scattering, also known as Raman scattering, occurs in the optical fibre. Unlike incident light, this scattered light undergoes a spectral shift by an amount equivalent to the resonance frequency of the lattice oscillation. The light scattered back from the fibre optic therefore contains three different spectral shares:

- the Rayleigh scattering with the wavelength of the laser source used,
- the Stokes line components from photons shifted to longer wavelength (lower frequency), and
- the anti-Stokes line components with photons shifted to shorter wavelength (higher frequency) than the Rayleigh scattering.

The intensity of the so-called anti-Stokes band is temperature-dependent, while the so-called Stokes band is practically independent of temperature. The local temperature of the optical fibre is derived from the ratio of the anti-Stokes and Stokes light intensities.

== Measuring principle—OTDR and OFDR technology ==
There are two basic principles of measurement for distributed sensing technology, OTDR (optical time-domain reflectometry) and OFDR (optical frequency-domain reflectometry). For distributed temperature sensing often a code correlation technology is employed which carries elements from both principles.

OTDR was developed more than 20 years ago and has become the industry standard for telecom loss measurements which detects the—compared to Raman signal very dominant—Rayleigh backscattering signals. The principle for OTDR is quite simple and is very similar to the time of flight measurement used for radar. Essentially a narrow laser pulse generated either by semiconductor or solid state lasers is sent into the fibre and the backscattered light is analysed. From the time it takes the backscattered light to return to the detection unit it is possible to locate the location of the temperature event.

Alternative DTS evaluation units deploy the method of Optical Frequency Domain Reflectometry (OFDR). The OFDR system provides information on the local characteristic only when the backscatter signal detected during the entire measurement time is measured as a function of frequency in a complex fashion, and then subjected to Fourier transformation. The essential principles of OFDR technology are the quasi continuous wave mode employed by the laser and the narrow-band detection of the optical backscatter signal. This is offset by the technically difficult measurement of the Raman scattered light and rather complex signal processing, due to the FFT calculation with higher linearity requirements for the electronic components.

Code Correlation DTS sends on/off sequences of limited length into the fiber. The codes are chosen to have suitable properties, e.g. binary Golay code. In contrast to OTDR technology, the optical energy is spread over a code rather than packed into a single pulse. Thus a light source with lower peak power compared to OTDR technology can be used, e.g. long life compact semiconductor lasers. The detected backscatter needs to be transformed—similar to OFDR technology—back into a spatial profile, e.g. by cross-correlation. In contrast to OFDR technology, the emission is finite (for example 128 bit) which avoids that weak scattered signals from far are superposed by strong scattered signals from short distance, improving the Shot noise and the signal-to-noise ratio.

Using these techniques it is possible to analyse distances of greater than 30 km from one system and to measure temperature resolutions of less than 0.01°C.

== Construction of sensing cable and system integration ==
The temperature measuring system consists of a controller (laser source, pulse generator for OTDR or code generator for Code Correlation or modulator and HF mixer for OFDR, optical module, receiver and micro-processor unit) and a quartz glass fibre as line-shaped temperature sensor. The fibre optic cable (can be 70 km in length) is passive in nature and has no individual sensing points and therefore can be manufactured based on standard telecoms fibres. This offers excellent economies of scale. Because the system designer/integrator does not have to worry about the precise location of each sensing point the cost for designing and installing a sensing system based on distributed fibre optic sensors is greatly reduced from that of traditional sensors. Additionally, because the sensing cable has no moving parts and design lives of >30 years, the maintenance and operation costs are also considerably less than for conventional sensors. Additional benefits of fibre optic sensing technology are that it is immune to electromagnetic interference, vibration and is safe for use in hazardous zones (the laser power falls below the levels that can cause ignition), thus making these sensors ideal for use in industrial sensing applications.

With regards to the construction of the sensing cable, although it is based on standard fibre optics, care must be taken in the design of the individual sensing cable to ensure that adequate protection is provided for the fibre. This must take into account operating temperature (standard cables operate to 85 °C, but it is possible to measure up to 700 °C with the correct design), gaseous environment (hydrogen can cause deterioration of the measurement though "hydrogen darkening" – aka attenuation – of the silica glass compounds) and mechanical protection.

Most of the available DTS systems have flexible system architectures and are relatively simple to integrate into industrial control systems such as SCADA. In the oil and gas industry an XML based file standard (WITSML) has been developed for transfer of data from DTS instruments. The standard is maintained by Energistics.

== Laser safety and operation of system ==
When operating a system based on optical measurements such as optical DTS, laser safety requirements need to be considered for permanent installations. Many systems use low power laser design, e.g. with classification as laser safety class 1M, which can be applied by anyone (no approved laser safety officers required). Some systems are based on higher power lasers of a 3B rating, which although safe for use by approved laser safety officers, may not be suitable for permanent installations.

The advantage of purely passive optical sensor technology is the lack of electric or electromagnetic interaction. Some DTS systems on the market use a special low power design and are inherently safe in explosive environments, e.g. certified to ATEX directive Zone 0.

For use in fire detection application, regulations usually require certified systems according to relevant standards, such as EN 54-5 or EN 54-22 (Europe), UL521 or FM (USA), cUL521 (Canada) and/or other national or local standards.

== For temperature estimation ==
Temperature distributions can be used to develop models based on the Proper Orthogonal Decomposition Method or principal component analysis. This allows to reconstruct the temperature distribution by measuring only in a few spatial locations

== Applications ==
Distributed temperature sensing can be deployed successfully in multiple industrial segments:

- Oil and gas production—permanent downhole monitoring, coil tubing optical enabled deployed intervention systems, slickline optical cable deployed intervention systems.
- Power cable and transmission line monitoring (ampacity optimisation)
- Fire detection in tunnels, industrial conveyor belts and special hazard buildings
- Industrial induction furnace surveillance
- Integrity of liquid natural gas (LNG) carriers and terminals
- Leakage detection at dikes and dams
- Temperature monitoring in plant and process engineering, including transmission pipelines
- Storage tanks and vessels

More recently, DTS has been applied for environmental monitoring as well:

- Stream temperature
- Groundwater source detection and sediment scouring and deposition
- Temperature profiles in a mine shaft and over lakes and glaciers
- Deep rainforest ambient temperature at various foliage densities
- Temperature profiles in an underground mine, Australia
- Temperature profiles in ground loop heat exchangers (used for ground coupled heating and cooling systems)

== See also ==
- Distributed acoustic sensing
- Fiber Bragg grating
- Fiber optic sensor
- Time-domain reflectometer
- Well logging
- WITSML
