= Microstructured optical fiber =

Type of optical fiber waveguide

Microstructured optical fibers (MOF) are optical fiber waveguides where guiding is obtained through manipulation of waveguide structure rather than its index of refraction.

In conventional optical fibers, light is guided through the effect of total internal reflection. The guiding occurs within a core of refractive index higher than refractive index of the surrounding material (cladding). The index change is obtained through different doping of the core and the cladding or through the use of different materials. In microstructured fibers, a completely different approach is applied. Fiber is built of one material (usually silica) and light guiding is obtained through the presence of air holes in the area surrounding the solid core. The holes are often arranged in the regular pattern in two dimensional arrays, however other patterns of holes exist, including non-periodic ones. While periodic arrangement of the holes would justify the use of term "photonic crystal fiber", the term is reserved for those fibers where propagation occurs within a photonic defect or due to photonic bandgap effect. As such, photonic crystal fibers may be considered a subgroup of microstructured optical fibers.

There are two main classes of MOF

1. Index guided fibers, where guiding is obtained through effect of total internal reflection
2. Photonic bandgap fibers, where guiding is obtained through constructive interference of scattered light (including photonic bandgap effect.)

Structured optical fibers, those based on channels running along their entire length go back to Kaiser and Co in 1974. These include air-clad optical fibers, microstructured optical fibers sometimes called photonic crystal fiber when the arrays of holes are periodic and look like a crystal, and many other subclasses. Martelli and Canning realized that the crystal structures that have identical interstitial regions are actually not the most ideal structure for practical applications and pointed out aperiodic structured fibers, such as Fractal fibers, are a better option for low bend losses. Aperiodic fibers are a subclass of Fresnel fibers which describe optical propagation in analogous terms to diffraction free beams. These too can be made by using air channels appropriately positioned on the virtual zones of the optical fiber.

Photonic crystal fibers are a variant of the microstructured fibers reported by Kaiser et al. They are an attempt to incorporate the bandgap ideas of Yeh et al. in a simple way by stacking periodically a regular array of channels and drawing into fiber form. The first such fibers did not propagate by such a bandgap but rather by an effective step index – however, the name has, for historical reasons, remained unchanged although some researchers prefer to call these fibers "holey" fibers or "microstructured" optical fibers in reference to the pre-existing work from Bell Labs. The shift into the nanoscale was pre-empted by the more recent label "structured" fibers. An extremely important variant was the air-clad fiber invented by DiGiovanni at Bell Labs in 1986/87 based on work by Marcatili et al. in 1984. This is perhaps the single most successful fiber design to date based on structuring the fiber design using air holes and has important applications regarding high numerical aperture and light collection especially when implemented in laser form, but with great promise in areas as diverse as biophotonics and astrophotonics.

Periodic structure may not be the best solution for many applications. Fibers that go well beyond shaping the near field now can be deliberately designed to shape the far-field for the first time, including focusing light beyond the end of the fiber. These Fresnel fibers use well known Fresnel optics which has long been applied to lens design, including more advanced forms used in aperiodic, fractal, and irregular adaptive optics, or Fresnel/fractal zones. Many other practical design benefits include broader photonic bandgaps in diffraction based propagating waveguides and reduced bend losses, important for achieving structured optical fibers with propagation losses below that of step-index fibers.
