= MFD =

MFD may refer to:

== Fire departments ==
- Madison Fire Department, US
- Minneapolis Fire Department, US
- Milwaukee Fire Department, US
- Mumbai Fire Brigade, India

== Science, technology, and medicine ==
- Macroscopic Fundamental Diagram, a type of fundamental diagram of traffic flow in transportation engineering
- Microfarad, a unit of electrical capacitance sometimes written as "MFD"
- Minimum focus distance, in macro photography
- Mode field diameter, an expression of distribution of the irradiance, across the end face of a single-mode fiber
- Modular function deployment, a method for product modularization
- Multifunction display, an interactive system for presenting various information
- Mutation Frequency Decline, a gene/gene product used in transcription-coupled repair

=== Computing ===
- Multifunction device, an office all-in-one device (copier, printer, scanner)
- Micro Floppy Disk, the 3½-inch floppy disk format; See History of the floppy disk
- Mini Floppy Disk, the 5¼-inch floppy disk format; See History of the floppy disk

=== Hiring ===
- m/f/d, an initialism welcoming "male, female and disabled (or diverse)" candidates.

=== Transportation ===
- Mansfield Lahm Regional Airport (IATA airport code)
- Minoan Flying Dolphins, a Greek ferry company

== See also ==
- Mladá fronta DNES (MF DNES), a daily newspaper in the Czech Republic
