= Modular Product Architecture =

Product design practice

A Modular Product Architecture is a product design practice, using principles of modularity. In short, a Modular Product Architecture can be defined as a collection of modules with unique functions and strategies, protected by interfaces to deliver an evolving family of market-driven products.

Karl Ulrich, Professor in Mechanical Engineering, defines a Product Architecture as “(1) the arrangement of functional elements; (2) the mapping from functional elements to physical components; (3) the specification of the interfaces among interacting physical components”. A Modular Product Architecture consists of interchangeable building blocks (modules) that can be combined into a variety of product variants.

Assigning strategic intent to each module enables the producing company to connect its business objectives with the design of the product:. This can be done by the use of Module Drivers. The Module Drivers were first defined in 1998 by Gunnar Erixon, PhD in Design Engineering at KTH Royal Institute of Technology, and grouped into Primary and Secondary Module Drivers. The Primary drivers defines the strategy of the module based on its need for development or variance, as follows

- Carry Over: Describes a part that is unlikely to undergo any design changes during the life of the Modular Product Architecture.
- Common Unit: Describes a part that can be used for the entire product assortment or large parts of it.
- Technical Specification: Describes a part that carries the product's variance and performance properties.
- Styling: Describes visible parts of the product that represent identity towards the customer. These parts are strongly influenced by trends and are often connected to a brand or trademark.
- Technology Push: Describes a part that is likely to undergo design changes due to changing demands or technology shifts.
- Planned Development: Describes a part that the company intends to further develop, for example to better fulfill a customer value or to cut cost. The planned changes are described in the Modular Product Architecture development plan.

Using standardized interfaces between the modules enables interchangeability of different variants of modules and ensures that the Modular Product Architecture can be maintained over time. This enables the producing company to continuously update and improve the Modular Product Architecture and respond to changing needs in the market.

Modular Product Architectures can be developed by the use of Modular function deployment.
