= ZBLAN =

Type of metal fluoride glass

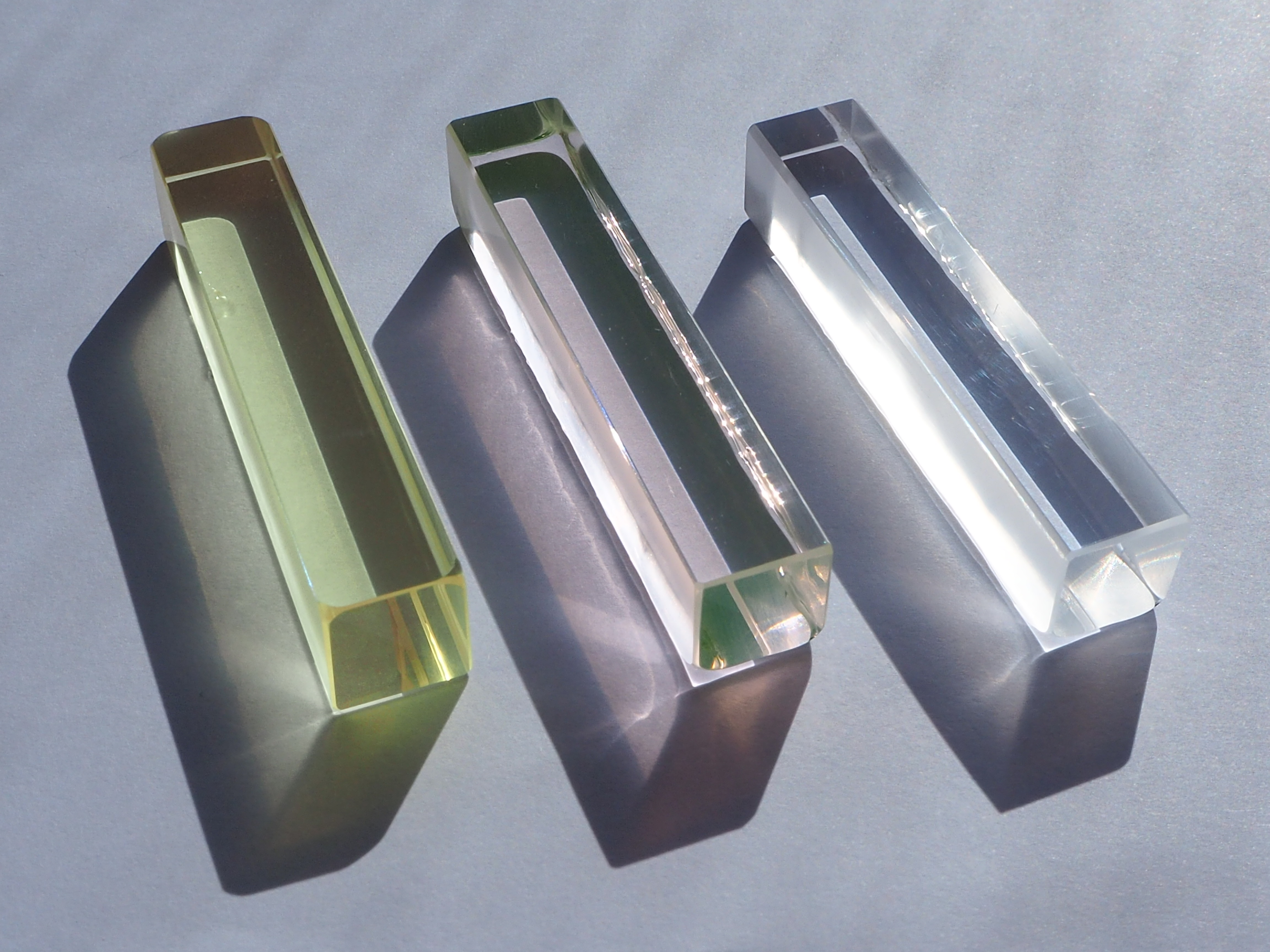
ZBLAN glass samples. The different colors correspond to different compositions of glass. From left to right: praseodymium doped, erbium doped and non-doped ZBLAN glasses.

ZBLAN is the most stable, and consequently the most used, fluoride glass, a subcategory of the heavy metal fluoride glass (HMFG) group. Typically its composition is 53% ZrF_{4}, 20% BaF_{2}, 4% LaF_{3}, 3% AlF_{3} and 20% NaF. ZBLAN is not a single material but rather has a spectrum of compositions, many of which are still untried. The biggest library in the world of ZBLAN glass compositions is currently owned by Le Verre Fluoré, the oldest company working on HMFG technology. Other current ZBLAN fiber manufacturers are Thorlabs and KDD Fiberlabs. Hafnium fluoride is chemically similar to zirconium fluoride, and is sometimes used in place of it.

ZBLAN glass has a broad optical transmission window extending from 0.22 micrometers in the UV to 7 micrometers in the infrared. ZBLAN has low refractive index (about 1.5), a relatively low glass transition temperature (T_{g}) of 260–300 °C, low dispersion and a low and negative temperature dependence of refractive index dn/dT.

== History ==
The first fluorozirconate glass was a serendipitous discovery in March 1974 by the Poulain brothers and their co-workers at the University of Rennes in France.

While looking for new crystalline complex fluorides, they obtained unexpected pieces of glass. In a first step, these glasses were investigated for spectroscopic purposes.

Glass formation was studied in the ZrF_{4}-BaF_{2}-NaF ternary system while the fluorescence of neodymium was characterized in quaternary ZrF_{4}-BaF_{2}-NaF-NdF_{3} bulk samples. The chemical composition of this original glass was very close to that of the classical ZBLAN, on the basis of a simple La/Nd substitution.

Further experimental work led to major advances. First, ammonium bifluoride processing replaced the initial preparation method based on heat treatment of anhydrous fluorides in a metallic sealed tube. This process was already used by K. H. Sun, a pioneer of beryllium fluoride glasses. It offers significant advantages: preparation is implemented at room atmosphere in long platinum crucibles, zirconium oxide can be used as a starting material instead of pure ZrF_{4}, synthesis time is reduced from 15 hours to less than one hour, and larger samples are obtained. One of the problems encountered was the devitrification tendency upon cooling the melt.

The second breakthrough was the discovery of the stabilizing effect of aluminum fluoride in fluorozirconate glasses. The initial systems were fluorozirconates with ZrF_{4} as the primary constituent (>50 mol%), BaF_{2} main modifier (>30 mol%) and other metal fluorides LaF_{3}, AlF_{3} added as tertiary constituents, to increase glass stability or improve other glass properties. Various pseudo-ternary systems were investigated at 4 mol% AlF_{3}, leading to the definition of 7 stable glasses, such as ZBNA, ZBLA, ZBYA, ZBCA that could be cast as multi-kilogram bulk samples and resulted later in the classical ZBLAN glass composition that combines ZBNA and ZBLA.

Further development on preparation method, scale-up, improvements of the manufacturing process, material stability and formulations was largely motivated by the experiments in French telecom at that time that found that intrinsic absorption for ZBLAN fibers was quite low (~10 dB/km) which could lead to an ultra-low optical loss solution in the mid-infrared. Such optical fibers could then become an excellent technical solution for a variety of systems for telecommunications, sensing and other applications.

== Glass preparation ==
Fluoride glasses have to be processed in a very dry atmosphere in order to avoid oxyfluoride formation which will lead to glass-ceramic (crystallized glass) formation. The material is usually manufactured by the melting-quenching method. First the raw products are introduced in a platinum crucible, then melted, fined above 800 °C and cast in a metallic mold to ensure a high cooling rate (quenching), which favors glass formation. Finally they are annealed in a furnace to reduce the thermal stresses induced during the quenching phase. This process results in large transparent pieces of fluoride glass.

== Material properties ==
=== Optical ===
The most obvious feature of fluoride glasses is their extended transmission range. It covers a broad optical spectrum from the UV to the mid-infrared.

The polarisability of fluorine anions is smaller than that of oxygen anions. For this reason, the refractive index of crystalline fluorides is generally low. This also applies to fluoride glasses: the index of ZBLAN glass is close to 1.5 while it exceeds 2 for zirconia ZrO_{2}. Cationic polarisability must also be considered. The general trend is that it increases with atomic number. Thus in crystals, the refractive index of lithium fluoride LiF is 1.39 while it is 1.72 for lead fluoride PbF_{2}. One exception concerns fluorozirconate glasses: hafnium is chemically very close to zirconium, but with a much larger atomic mass (178 g vs 91 g); but the refractive index of fluorohafnate glasses is smaller than that of fluorozirconates with the same molar composition. This is classically explained by the well known lanthanidic contraction that results from the filling of the f subshell and leads to a smaller ionic radius. Substituting zirconium by hafnium makes an easy way to adjust the numerical aperture of optical fibers.

Optical dispersion expresses the variation of the refractive index with wavelength. It is expected to be low for glasses with a small refractive index. In the visible spectrum it is often quantified by the Abbe number. ZBLAN exhibits zero dispersion at about 1.72 μm, compared with 1.5 μm for silica glass.

Refractive index changes with temperature because the polarisability of the chemical bonds increases with temperature, and because thermal expansion decreases the number of polarisable elements per unit volume. As a result, dn/dT is positive for silica, while it is negative for fluoride glasses.

At high power densities, refractive index follows the relation :

n = n_{0} + n_{2}I

where n_{0} is the index observed at low power levels, n_{2} the nonlinear index and I the average electromagnetic field. Nonlinearity is smaller in low-index materials. In ZBLAN n_{2}'s value lies between 1 and 2×10^{−20} m^{2}W^{−1}.

=== Thermal ===
The glass transition temperature T_{g} is the major characteristic temperature of a glass. It corresponds to the transition between solid state and liquid state. At temperatures higher than T_{g}, glass is not rigid: its shape will change under external strain or even under its own weight. For ZBLAN, T_{g} ranges from 250 to 300 °C, depending on composition; mainly sodium content.

Beyond T_{g}, molten glass becomes prone to devitrification. This transformation is commonly evidenced by differential thermal analysis (DTA). Two characteristic temperatures are measured from the DTA curve: T_{x} corresponds to the onset of crystallization and T_{c} is taken at the maximum of the exothermic peak. Glass scientists also use liquidus temperature T_{L}. Beyond this temperature liquid does not produce any crystal and it may remain indefinitely in the liquid state.

Thermal expansion data have been reported for a number of fluoride glasses, in the temperature range between ambient and T_{g}. In this range, as for most glasses, expansion is almost linearly dependent on temperature.

== Fiber optics ==
Thanks to their glassy state, ZBLAN can be drawn into optical fibers, using two glass compositions with different refractive indices to ensure guidance: the core glass and the cladding glass. It is critical to the quality of the manufactured fiber to ensure that during the fiber drawing process the drawing temperature and the humidity of the environment are highly controlled. In contrast to other glasses, the temperature dependence of ZBLAN's viscosity is very steep.

ZBLAN fiber manufacturers have demonstrated significant increases in mechanical properties (>100 kpsi or 700 MPa for 125 μm fiber) and attenuation as low as 3 dB/km at 2.6 μm. ZBLAN optical fibers are used in different applications such as spectroscopy and sensing, laser power delivery and fiber lasers and amplifiers.

=== Comparison with alternative fiber technologies ===
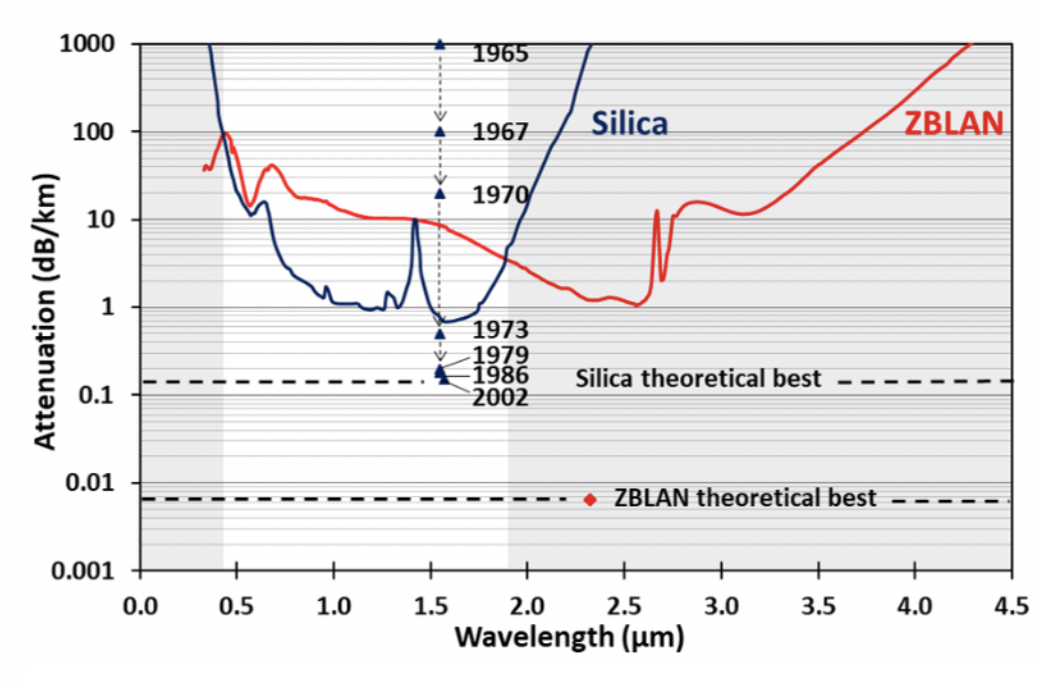
Experimental attenuation curve of low-loss multimode silica and ZBLAN fiber

Early silica optical fiber had attenuation coefficients on the order of 1000 dB/km, as reported in 1965. Kapron et al. reported in 1970 fibers having an attenuation coefficient of ~20 dB/km at 0.632 μm, and Miya et al. reported in 1979 ~0.2 dB/km attenuation at 1.550 μm. Nowadays, silica optical fibers are routinely manufactured with an attenuation of <0.2 dB/km with Nagayama et al. reporting in 2002 an attenuation coefficient as low as 0.151 dB/km at 1.568 μm. The four order of magnitude reduction in the attenuation of silica optical fibers over four decades was the result of constant improvement of manufacturing processes, raw material purity, and improved preform and fiber designs, which allowed these fibers to approach the theoretical lower limit of attenuation.

The advantages of ZBLAN over silica are: superior transmittance (especially in the UV and IR), higher bandwidth for signal transmission, spectral broadening (or supercontinuum generation) and low chromatic dispersion.

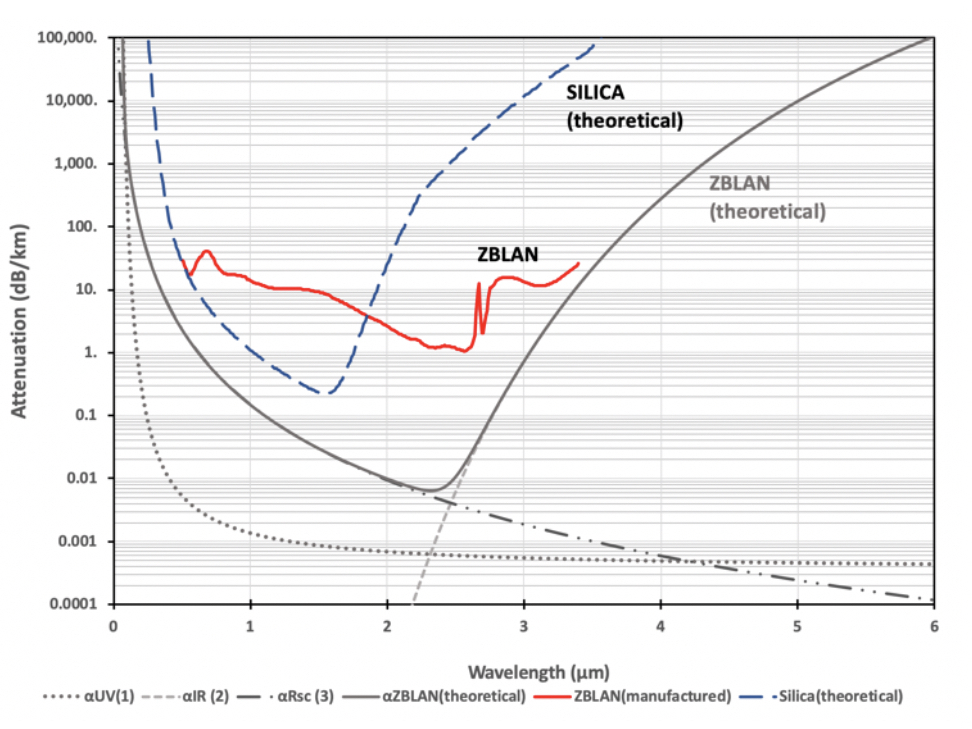
Theoretical loss spectra (attenuation, dB/km) for a typical ZBLAN optical fiber (solid gray line) as function of wavelength (microns)

The graph at right compares, as a function of wavelength, the theoretical predicted attenuation (dB/km) of silica (dashed blue line) with a typical ZBLAN formulation (solid gray line) as constructed from the dominant contributions: Rayleigh scattering (dashed gray line), infrared (IR) absorption (dashed black line) and UV absorption (dotted gray line).

The difficulties that the community encountered when trying to use heavy metal fluoride glasses in the early years of development for a variety of applications were mostly related to the fragility of the fibers, a major drawback that prevented their broader adoption. However, the developers and manufacturers have dedicated significant effort in the last two decades to better understand the underlying causes of fiber fragility. The original fiber failure was primarily caused by surface defects, largely related to crystallization due to nucleation and growth, phenomena induced by factors such as raw material impurities and environmental conditions (humidity of the atmosphere during drawing, atmospheric pollutants such as vapors and dust, etc.) during processing. The particular focus on processing improvements has resulted in a 10× increase in the fiber strength. Compared to silica fiber, the intrinsic fiber strength of HMFG is currently only a factor of 2–3 lower. For example, the breaking radius of a standard 125 μm single-mode fiber is < 1.5 mm for silica and < 4 mm for ZBLAN. The technology has evolved such that HMFG fibers can be jacketed to ensure that the bending radius of the cable will never reach the breaking point and thus comply with industrial requirements. The product catalogs usually call out a safe bending radius to ensure that end users handling the fiber stay within the safe margins.

Contrary to current opinion fluoride glasses are very stable even in humid atmospheres and usually don't require dry storage as long as water will remain in the vapor phase (i.e. not being condensed on the fiber). Problems arise when the surface of the fiber comes in direct contact with liquid water (the polymeric coating usually applied to the fibers is permeable to water allowing water to diffuse through it). Current storage and transportation techniques require a very simple packaging strategy: the fiber spools are usually sealed with plastic together with a desiccant to avoid water condensation on the fiber. Studies of water attack on HMFG have shown that prolonged (> 1 hour) contact with water induces a drop in the pH of the solution which in turn increases the rate of the attack of water (the rate of attack of water increases with decreased pH). The leach rate of ZBLAN in water at pH = 8 is 10^{−5} g·cm^{2}/day with five orders of magnitude decrease between pH = 2 and pH = 8. The particular sensitivity of HMFG fibers such as ZBLAN to water is due to the chemical reaction between water molecules and the F^{−} anions which leads to the slow dissolution of the fibers. Silica fibers have a similar vulnerability to hydrofluoric acid, HF, which induces direct attack on the fibers leading to their breakup. Atmospheric moisture has a very limited effect on fluoride glasses in general, and fluoride glass/fibers can be used in a wide range of operating environments over extended periods of time without any material degradation.

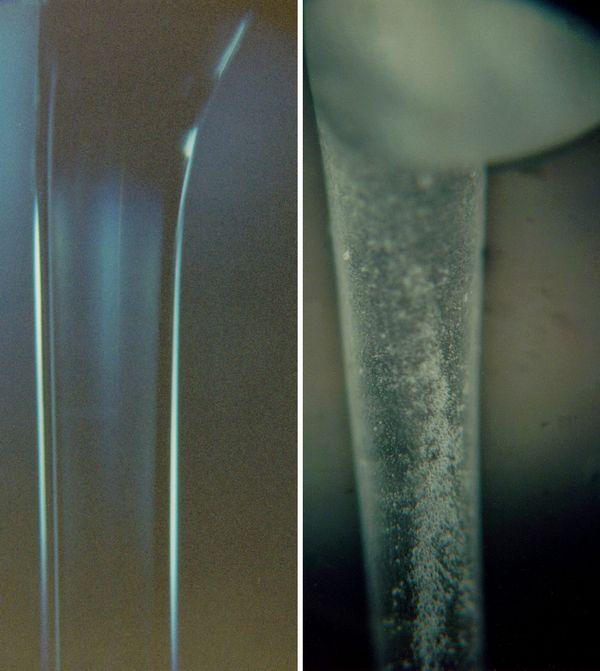
ZBLAN produced with the same equipment in zero gravity (left) and in normal gravity (right)

A large variety of multicomponent fluoride glasses have been fabricated but few can be drawn into optical fiber. The fiber fabrication is similar to any glass-fiber drawing technology. All methods involve fabrication from the melt, which creates inherent problems such as the formation of bubbles, core-clad interface irregularities, and small preform sizes. The process occurs at 310 °C in a controlled atmosphere (to minimize contamination by moisture or oxygen impurities which significantly weaken the fiber) using a narrow heat zone compared to silica. Drawing is complicated by a small difference (only 124 °C) between the glass transition temperature and the crystallization temperature. As a result, ZBLAN fibers often contain undesired crystallites. The concentration of crystallites was shown in 1998 to be reduced by making ZBLAN in zero gravity (see figure). One hypothesis is that microgravity suppresses convection in the atmosphere surrounding the fiber during the drawing process, leading to the formation of fewer crystallites. One recent experiment aims to examine whether electrostatically levitated ZBLAN fibers can be made to exhibit properties similar to those obtained in microgravity. However, as of 2021, no quantitative models have been proposed to explain the experimental observations, and the precise causes of the differences between ZBLAN fibers drawn under different gravitational situations remain unknown.
