= Radiation effects on optical fibers =

When optical fibers are exposed to ionizing radiation such as energetic electrons, protons, neutrons, X-rays, Ƴ-radiation, etc., they undergo 'damage'. The term 'damage' primarily refers to added optical absorption, resulting in loss of the propagating optical signal leading to decreased power at the output end, which could lead to premature failure of the component and or system.

== Description ==
In the professional literature, the effect is often named Radiation Induced Attenuation (RIA), or Radiation-induced darkening. The loss of power or 'darkening' occurs because the chemical bonds forming the optical fiber core are disrupted by the impinging high energy resulting in the appearance of new electronic transition states giving rise to additional absorption in the wavelength regions of interest. The radiation induced defects tend to absorb more at shorter wavelengths, and hence radiation-damaged glass appears to yellow.

Once radiation source is removed, the fiber can recover some of its original transparency (a process called recovery or "self-healing"), which occurs due to thermal annealing or photobleaching of the defects. The extent of damage is governed by the balance between defect generation (excess attenuation) on one hand and defect annihilation (recovery) on the other hand. If the dose rate is low, an equilibrium state (between attenuation and recovery) is reached with some degree of darkening. However, if the dose rate is high, the utility of fiber depends on the overall induced attenuation and the recovery time. Understanding these radiation induced effects is important particularly for space based applications where optical fibers are being considered for use in increasing number of applications.

== Defects ==
Intrinsic defects are present in the matrix of even a single component glass material like pure silica. These include per-oxy linkages, POL (≡Si-O-O-Si≡) which are oxygen interstitials, and oxygen deficient centers, ODC (≡Si-Si≡) which are oxygen vacancies. When exposed to ionizing radiation, these sites trap charge (typically holes) to form per-oxy radicals, POR (≡Si-O-O.) and E’ centers (≡Si.), respectively. These trapped charges interact with the electric field of the electromagnetic wave, causing absorption. In addition, rapidly cooled silica has strained ≡Si-O-Si≡ bonds, which are cleaved upon radiation to form non-bridging oxygen hole centers (NBOHC) depicted as ≡Si-O. and E’ centers by trapping holes and electrons, respectively. When the glass contains a second network former with the same valence as silicon such as germanium, the difference in the electronegativities favors the dopant as a hole trap.

== Reducing damage ==
Hence radiation damage occurs in doped silica glass. To improve radiation resistance of pure silica core fibers, it is necessary to minimize the number density of these intrinsic defects. Minimization of defects is achieved not only by reducing the incorporation of impurities in glass but also by controlling the input gas composition, optimizing the thermal history of glass at all stages of fiber manufacturing and optimizing the stress in the fiber core. Other strategies include incorporation of dopants (such as fluorine) in the core that minimize formation of defect centers discussed above.

== Optical fibers ==
All optical fibers undergo some darkening depending on a number of factors that include: ionization type, optical fiber core glass composition, operating wavelength, dose rate, total accumulated dose, temperature and power propagating through the core. Since attenuation is composition dependent, it is observed that fibers having pure silica cores and fluorine down doped claddings are amongst the most radiation hard fibers. The presence of dopants in the core such as germanium, phosphorus, boron, aluminum, erbium, ytterbium, thulium, holmium etc. compromises the radiation hardness of optical fibers. To minimize damage consequences, it is better to use a pure silica core fiber at higher operating wavelength, lower dose rate, lower total accumulated dose, higher temperature (accelerated recovery) and higher signal power (photo-bleaching). In addition to these intrinsic steps, external engineering may be required to shield the fiber from the effects of radiation.

== Core fibers ==
Germanium-doped core fibers can be radiation hard even at high concentrations of germanium. Such fibers reach saturation, anneal well at higher temperatures and are also responsive to photo-bleaching. In case of phosphorus-doped core fibers, attenuation increases linearly with increasing phosphorus content and these fibers do not reach saturation. Recovery is very difficult even at higher temperatures. Boron, aluminum and all the rare-earth dopants significantly affect fiber loss.

Radiation performances of various SM, MM and PM fibers manufactured by different vendors that were tested in wide range of radiation environments have been compiled.
