= Drawing tower =

Drawing optical fiber

A drawing tower produces a fine glass filament by drawing a glass preform. The tip of the preform is heated to melting temperature and then a strand of molten material is pulled downward. Industrial drawing towers range in height from 30 to 45 meters. A drawing tower is used in the production of optical fiber, for example for fiber-optic communication cables. The preform is a multi-layered cylinder typically 20 cm in diameter, and 2 m long.
