= Mode field diameter =

In fiber optics, the mode field diameter (MFD) is a measure of the width of an irradiance distribution, i.e., the optical power per unit area, across the end face of a single-mode fiber. It is analogous to the $1/e^2$ measure of the beam diameter for a beam propagating in free space.

The mode field diameter is defined as twice the mode field radius, and the mode field radius is equal to the distance from the center at which the electric and magnetic field strengths are reduced to $1/e$ of their maximum values. Since the intensity (given by the Poynting vector) is proportional to the square of the field amplitude, the intensity drops by $1/e^2 = 0.135$ or -8.69 dB at this distance from the center. For a Gaussian-shaped mode, the mode field diameter is twice the beam waist $w$.

The MFD is typically slightly larger than the core of an optical fiber extending slightly into the cladding.

== See also ==
- Beam diameter
- Gaussian beam
