= Fluoride glass =

Class of glasses based on fluorides rather than oxides

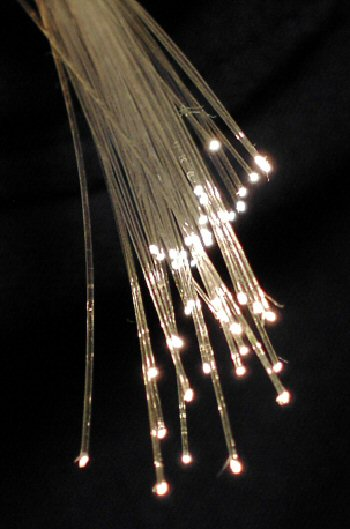
A bundle of optical fibers

Fluoride glass is a class of non-oxide optical glasses composed of fluorides of various metals. They can contain heavy metals such as zirconium, or be combined with lighter elements like aluminium and beryllium. These heavier elements cause the glass to have a transparency range extended into the infrared wavelength.

Thus, the goal for heavy metal fluoride glasses (HMFG) is to create ultra-low loss optical fiber communication systems for commercial and defense applications as well as bulk components that can be used in invasive medical treatment. However, the heavier elements also cause the glass to have a low viscosity and make them vulnerable to crystallization during the glass transition or processing. This makes the glass more fragile and have poor resistance to moisture and environmental attacks.

Fluoride glasses' best attribute is that they lack the absorption band associated with the hydroxyl (-OH) group (3.2–3.6 micrometers) which is present in nearly all oxide-based glasses.

== Properties ==
Fluoride fiber's optical properties can be determined by the intrinsic and extrinsic sources of loss. There are three sources of intrinsic loss for fluoride glass: UV absorption edge, Rayleigh scattering, and multiphonon absorption.

At short wavelengths within the UV and visible spectrum, the UV absorption edge is the dominant effect. The UV absorption edge occurs when a wavelength of energy matches the electron transition or ionization potential and is absorbed into the material as an electron is ejected into another quantum state. However, this absorption only occurs at short wavelengths and rapidly decreases as the wavelength increases.

In the visible to the near-infrared range of light, Rayleigh scattering is the dominant effect. Rayleigh scattering is the dispersion or elastic scattering of particles far smaller than the wavelength of energy. It is the reason the sky is blue as light from the sun is scattered by the molecules in the air. Since glass is an amorphous solid and has minor variations in density across a fiber, Rayleigh scattering occurs and energy dissipates. However, the Rayleigh scattering scales inversely with wavelength so as the wavelength increases, the Rayleigh scattering decreases.

Compared to silica glass, fluoride glasses undergo multiphonon scattering at longer wavelengths which is why they stay transparent into the infrared spectrum. This is where multiple phonons are created with the absorption and conjunction of a single phonon. This is important specifically in glass because neighboring ions vibrating against each other in phase can cause multiphonon scattering to occur. Since fluoride glasses have heavier ions than their silica counterpart, there are lower vibration frequencies that correspond to a longer infrared absorption edge.

The extrinsic sources of loss come mainly from crystallite scattering and impurity absorption. The main extrinsic source of loss comes from crystallite scattering. Crystallite scattering results from the directional ordering of a set of atoms that reflect and absorb wavelengths of energy differently. Since fluorite glasses tend to devitrify very readily, it can be difficult to avoid crystallization during processing. Impurity absorption arises from the many transitions and some rare earth elements that can be contained in the glass. Since these elements are absorptive in the mid-infrared range, there needs to be less than 1ppb levels of contamination so that the extrinsic loss is less than the intrinsic loss.

An example of a heavy metal fluoride glass is the ZBLAN glass group, composed of zirconium, barium, lanthanum, aluminum, and sodium fluorides. These materials' main technological application is as optical waveguides in planar and fiber form. They are advantageous especially in mid-infrared (2000-5000 nm) range.

== Synthesis and processing ==
The first step in fluoride glass synthesis is batch preparation. The most important criteria of this step are the purity requirements which are specific for the cation that is desired. In general, many different diamagnetic cations can be tolerated so the things that should be monitored are the optically absorbent impurities and anionic impurities, such as nitrates, carbonates, and sulfates. One major impurity that should be avoided is water, as the anionic impurities and water can cause anionic oxygen to arise in the final product. To avoid this, each individual material should be dehydrated or heated to prevent water contamination during synthesis.

After mixing the initial materials, the batch is heated to its melting temperature within a crucible. This raw glass often has high devitrified areas when the glass is dried in the crucible. This is tuned through the fining process that heats the melt above the liquidus temperature. As the heat increases, the viscosity decreases and the melt becomes homogenized without stirring and defects are removed.

The result is a homogeneous, clear glass after cooling. There are many methods for cooling but the classical method involved cooling to just above the liquidus temperature and then melting into a cast and quench. When using a mold, there may be non-uniform cooling depending on the mold shape and weight. This casting method is fast, flexible, and can create many different shapes and sizes. However, it is limited because it exposes the glass to atmospheric contamination. There may be micro-crystalline phases still present in the glass at the top of the mold due to condensates. Additionally, bubbles may not reach the surface because the glass is frozen in the mold. Another method of cooling is through the mold-crucible method where the sample is cooled inside the crucible it was melted in. This means there is no exposure to the atmosphere or outside contamination, but the resulting glass is limited to the shape of the crucible. The last method of cooling is rapid quenching and is reserved for less stable glasses.

== Application ==
The main goal in fluoride glass research and development is an ultra-low loss optical fiber communication system. Since fluoride glass fibers are transparent in the infrared range, they can transmit wavelengths of energy across a large area.

A secondary goal for fluoride glasses is infrared transmitting optical fibers and bulk components in the medical field. Fluoride optical fibers may transmit a laser beam into the body during surgery for less invasive procedures. They can also be used as gas or liquid sensors within the body by putting a light produced through the fiber via laser or LED on one side of the fiber and detecting the change on the other. Additionally, it allows for molecules with absorption bands in the infrared range to be detected through infrared spectroscopy.
