= Optical fiber =

Light-conducting fiber

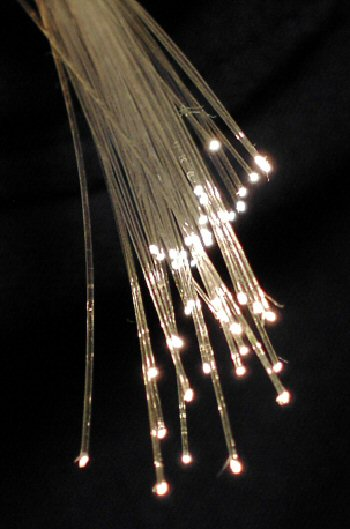
A bundle of optical fibers

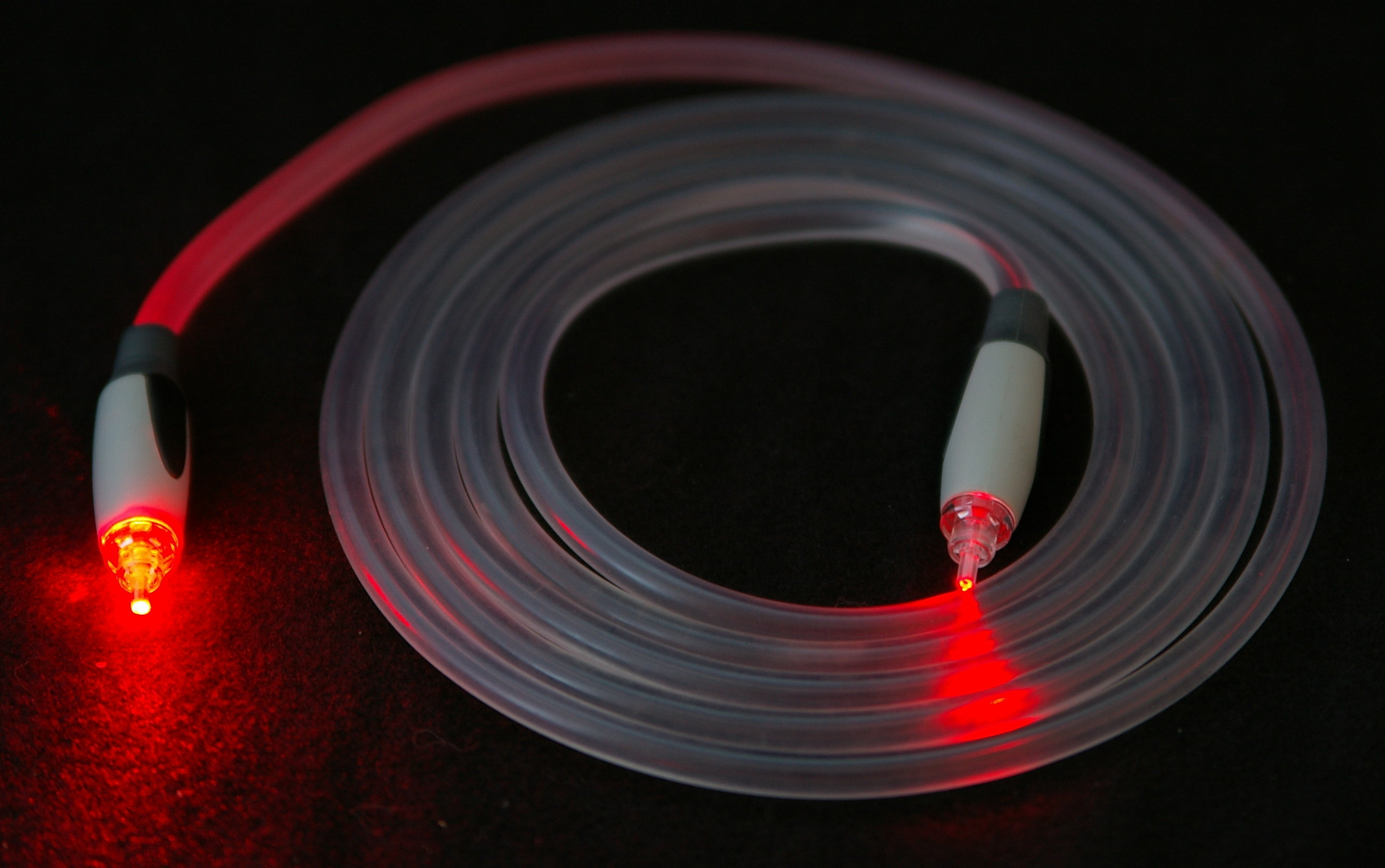
A TOSLINK fiber optic audio cable with red light shining in one end and out the other

An optical fiber, or optical fibre, is a flexible glass or plastic fiber that can transmit light (Note: Including infrared and ultraviolet radiation.) from one end to the other. Such fibers are widely used in fiber-optic communication, where they permit transmission over longer distances and at higher bandwidths (data transfer rates) than electrical cables. Fibers are used instead of cables because signals travel along them with less loss and are immune to electromagnetic interference.

Fibers are also used for illumination and imaging, and are often wrapped in bundles so they may be used to carry light into, or images out of confined spaces, as in the case of a fiberscope. Specially designed fibers are also used for a variety of other applications, such as fiber optic sensors and fiber lasers.

Glass optical fibers are typically made by drawing, while plastic fibers can be made either by drawing or by extrusion. Optical fibers typically include a core surrounded by a transparent cladding material with a lower index of refraction. Light is kept in the core by the phenomenon of total internal reflection which causes the fiber to act as a waveguide. Fibers that support many propagation paths or transverse modes are called multi-mode fibers, while those that support a single mode are called single-mode fibers (SMF). Multi-mode fibers generally have a wider core diameter and are used for short-distance communication links and for applications where high power must be transmitted. Single-mode fibers are used for most communication links longer than 1,050 meters (3,440 ft).

Being able to join optical fibers with low loss is important in fiber optic communication. This is more complex than joining electrical wire or cable and involves careful cleaving of the fibers, precise alignment of the fiber cores, and the coupling of these aligned cores. For applications that demand a permanent connection, a fusion splice is common. In this technique, an electric arc is used to melt the ends of the fibers together. Another common technique is a mechanical splice, where the ends of the fibers are held in contact by mechanical force. Temporary or semi-permanent connections are made by means of specialized optical fiber connectors. The field of applied science and engineering concerned with the design and application of optical fibers is known as fiber optics. The term was coined by Indian-American physicist Narinder Singh Kapany.

== History ==
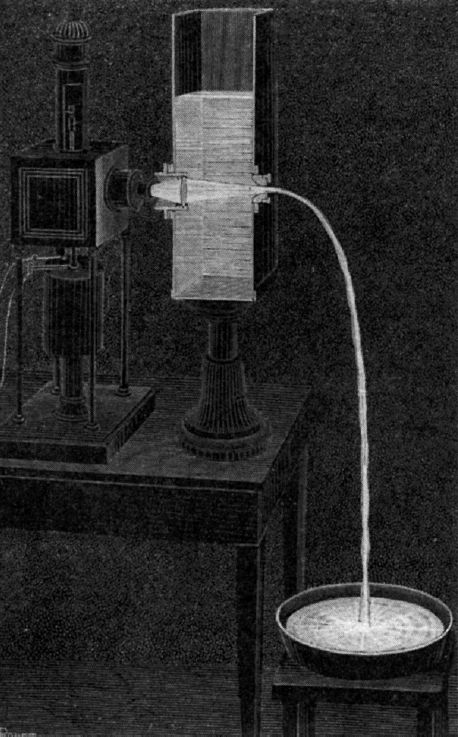
Colladon's "light fountain"

Daniel Colladon and Jacques Babinet first demonstrated the guiding of light by refraction, the principle that makes fiber optics possible, in Paris in the early 1840s. John Tyndall included a demonstration of it in his public lectures in London, 12 years later. Tyndall also wrote about the property of total internal reflection in an introductory book about the nature of light in 1870:

When the light passes from air into water, the refracted ray is bent towards the perpendicular... When the ray passes from water to air it is bent from the perpendicular... If the angle which the ray in water encloses with the perpendicular to the surface be greater than 48 degrees, the ray will not quit the water at all: it will be totally reflected at the surface... The angle which marks the limit where total reflection begins is called the limiting angle of the medium. For water this angle is 48°27′, for flint glass it is 38°41′, while for a diamond it is 23°42′.

In the late 19th century, a team of Viennese doctors guided light through bent glass rods to illuminate body cavities. Practical applications such as close internal illumination during dentistry followed early in the twentieth century. Image transmission through tubes was demonstrated independently by the radio experimenter Clarence Hansell and the television pioneer John Logie Baird in the 1920s. In the 1930s, Heinrich Lamm showed that one could transmit images through a bundle of unclad optical fibers and used it for internal medical examinations, but his work was largely forgotten.

In 1953, Dutch scientist Bram van Heel first demonstrated image transmission through bundles of optical fibers with a transparent cladding. Later that same year, Harold Hopkins and Narinder Singh Kapany at Imperial College in London succeeded in making image-transmitting bundles with over 10,000 fibers, and subsequently achieved image transmission through a 75 cm long bundle which combined several thousand fibers. The first practical fiber optic semi-flexible gastroscope was patented by Basil Hirschowitz, C. Wilbur Peters, and Lawrence E. Curtiss, researchers at the University of Michigan, in 1956. In the process of developing the gastroscope, Curtiss produced the first glass-clad fibers; previous optical fibers had relied on air or impractical oils and waxes as the low-index cladding material. Kapany coined the term fiber optics after writing a 1960 article in Scientific American that introduced the topic to a wide audience. He subsequently wrote the first book about the new field.

The first working fiber-optic data transmission system was demonstrated by German physicist Manfred Börner at Telefunken Research Labs in Ulm in 1965, followed by the first patent application for this technology in 1966. In 1968, NASA used fiber optics in the television cameras that were sent to the Moon. At the time, the use in the cameras was classified confidential, and employees handling the cameras had to be supervised by someone with an appropriate security clearance.

Charles K. Kao and George A. Hockham of the British company Standard Telephones and Cables (STC) were the first to promote the idea that the attenuation in optical fibers could be reduced below 20 decibels per kilometer (dB/km), making fibers a practical communication medium, in 1965. They proposed that the attenuation in fibers available at the time was caused by impurities that could be removed, rather than by fundamental physical effects such as scattering. They correctly and systematically theorized the light-loss properties for optical fiber and pointed out the right material to use for such fibers—silica glass with high purity. This discovery earned Kao the Nobel Prize in Physics in 2009. The crucial attenuation limit of 20 dB/km was first achieved in 1970 by researchers Robert D. Maurer, Donald Keck, Peter C. Schultz, and Frank Zimar working for American glass maker Corning Glass Works. They demonstrated a fiber with 17 dB/km attenuation by doping silica glass with titanium. A few years later, they produced a fiber with only 4 dB/km attenuation using germanium dioxide as the core dopant. In 1981, General Electric produced fused quartz ingots that could be drawn into strands 25 miles (40 km) long.

Initially, high-quality optical fibers could only be manufactured at two meters per second. Chemical engineer Thomas Mensah joined Corning in 1983 and increased the speed of manufacture to over 50 meters per second, making optical fiber cables cheaper than traditional copper ones. These innovations ushered in the era of optical fiber telecommunication. The Italian research center CSELT worked with Corning to develop practical optical fiber cables, resulting in the first metropolitan fiber optic cable being deployed in Turin in 1977. CSELT also developed an early technique for splicing optical fibers, called Springroove.

Attenuation in modern optical cables is far less than in electrical copper cables, leading to long-haul fiber connections with repeater distances of 70–150 kilometers (43–93 mi). Two teams, led by David N. Payne of the University of Southampton and Emmanuel Desurvire at Bell Labs, developed the erbium-doped fiber amplifier, which reduced the cost of long-distance fiber systems by reducing or eliminating optical-electrical-optical repeaters, in 1986 and 1987 respectively.

The emerging field of photonic crystals led to the development in 1991 of photonic-crystal fiber, which guides light by diffraction from a periodic structure, rather than by total internal reflection. The first photonic crystal fibers became commercially available in 2000. Photonic crystal fibers can carry higher power than conventional fibers and their wavelength-dependent properties can be manipulated to improve performance. These fibers can have hollow cores.

== Uses ==
=== Communication ===
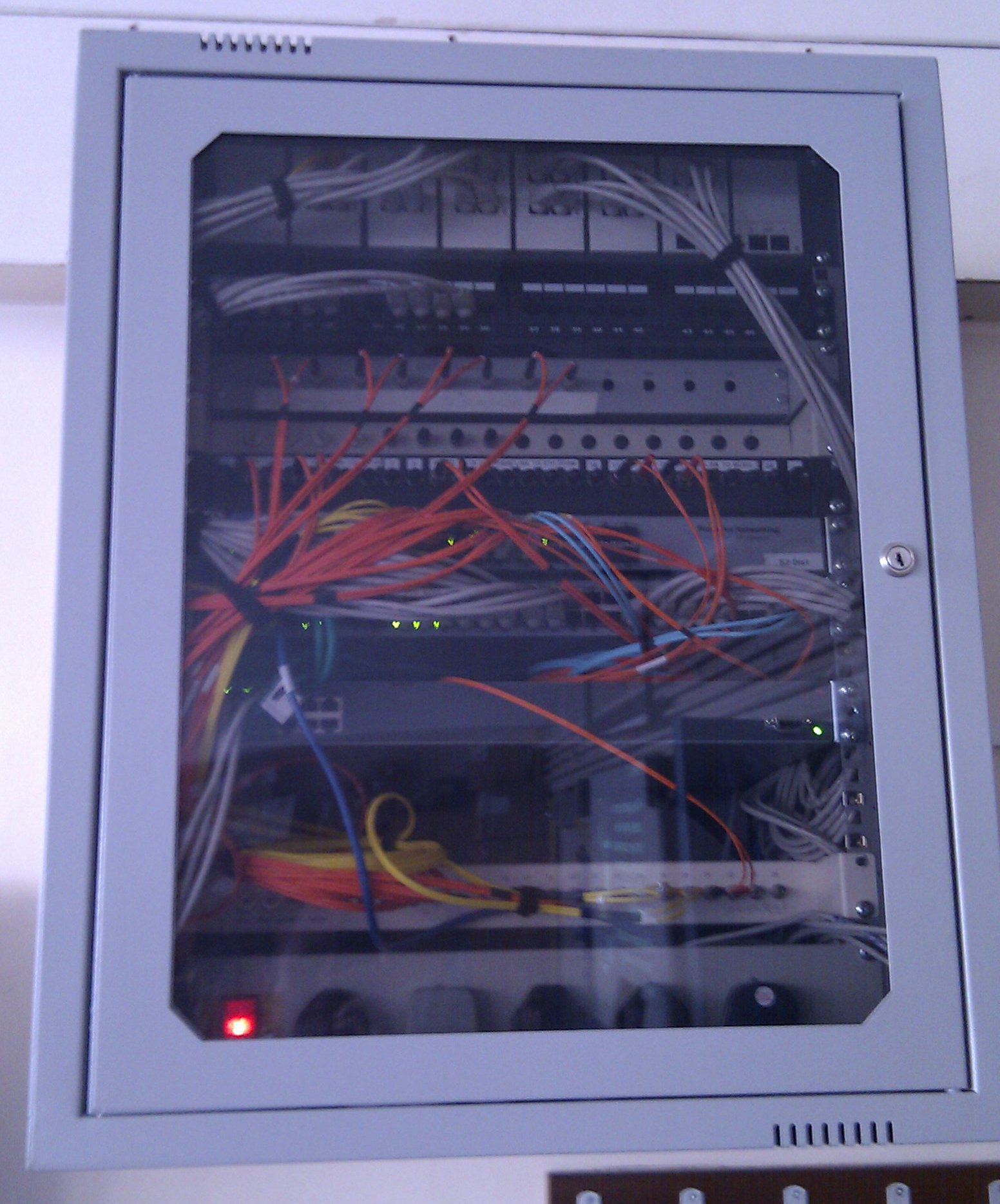
A wall-mount cabinet containing optical fiber cables. The yellow cables are single mode fibers; the orange and aqua cables are multi-mode fibers.

Optical fiber is used as a medium for telecommunication and computer networking because it is flexible and can be bundled as cables. It is especially advantageous for long-distance communications because infrared light propagates through the fiber with much lower attenuation compared to electricity in electrical cables. This allows long distances to be spanned with few repeaters.

A data transfer rate of 10 or 40 Gbit/s is typical in deployed systems.

Using wavelength-division multiplexing (WDM) enables each fiber to carry many independent channels, each using a different wavelength of light. The net data rate (data rate without overhead bytes) per fiber is the per-channel data rate reduced by the forward error correction (FEC) overhead, multiplied by the number of channels (usually up to 80 in commercial dense WDM systems as of 2008).

Transmission speed milestones
Date	Milestone
2006	111 Gbit/s by NTT.
2009	100 Pbit/s·km (15.5 Tbit/s over a single 7000 km fiber) by Bell Labs.
2011	101 Tbit/s (370 channels at 273 Gbit/s each) on a single core.
January 2013	1.05 Pbit/s transmission through a multi-core (lightpath) fiber cable.
June 2013	400 Gbit/s over a single channel using 4-mode orbital angular momentum multiplexing.
October 2022	1.84 Pbit/s using a photonic chip
October 2023	22.9 Pbit/s by NICT

For short-distance applications, such as a network in an office building (see fiber to the office), fiber-optic cabling can save space in cable ducts. This is because a single fiber can carry much more data than electrical cables such as standard category 5 cable, which typically runs at 100 Mbit/s or 1 Gbit/s speeds. Fibers are often also used for short-distance connections between devices. For example, most high-definition televisions offer a digital audio optical connection. This allows the streaming of audio over light, using the S/PDIF protocol over an optical TOSLINK connection.

==== Military ====
Fiber optic drones have been used in the Russo-Ukrainian War since March 2024. These types of drones are immune to electromagnetic interference and are not affected by electronic warfare systems.

=== Lighting ===
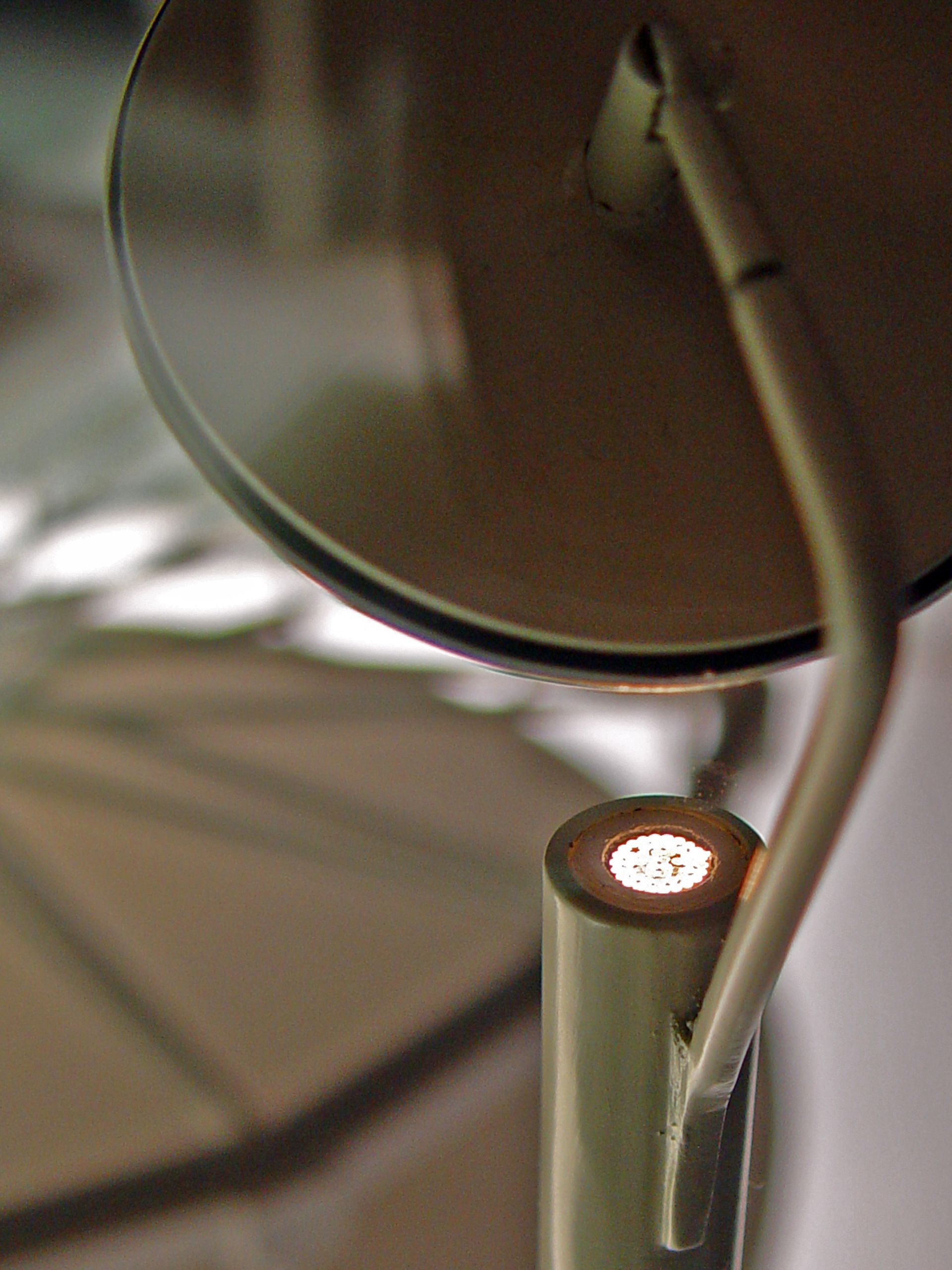
An optical fiber bundle in a luminaire

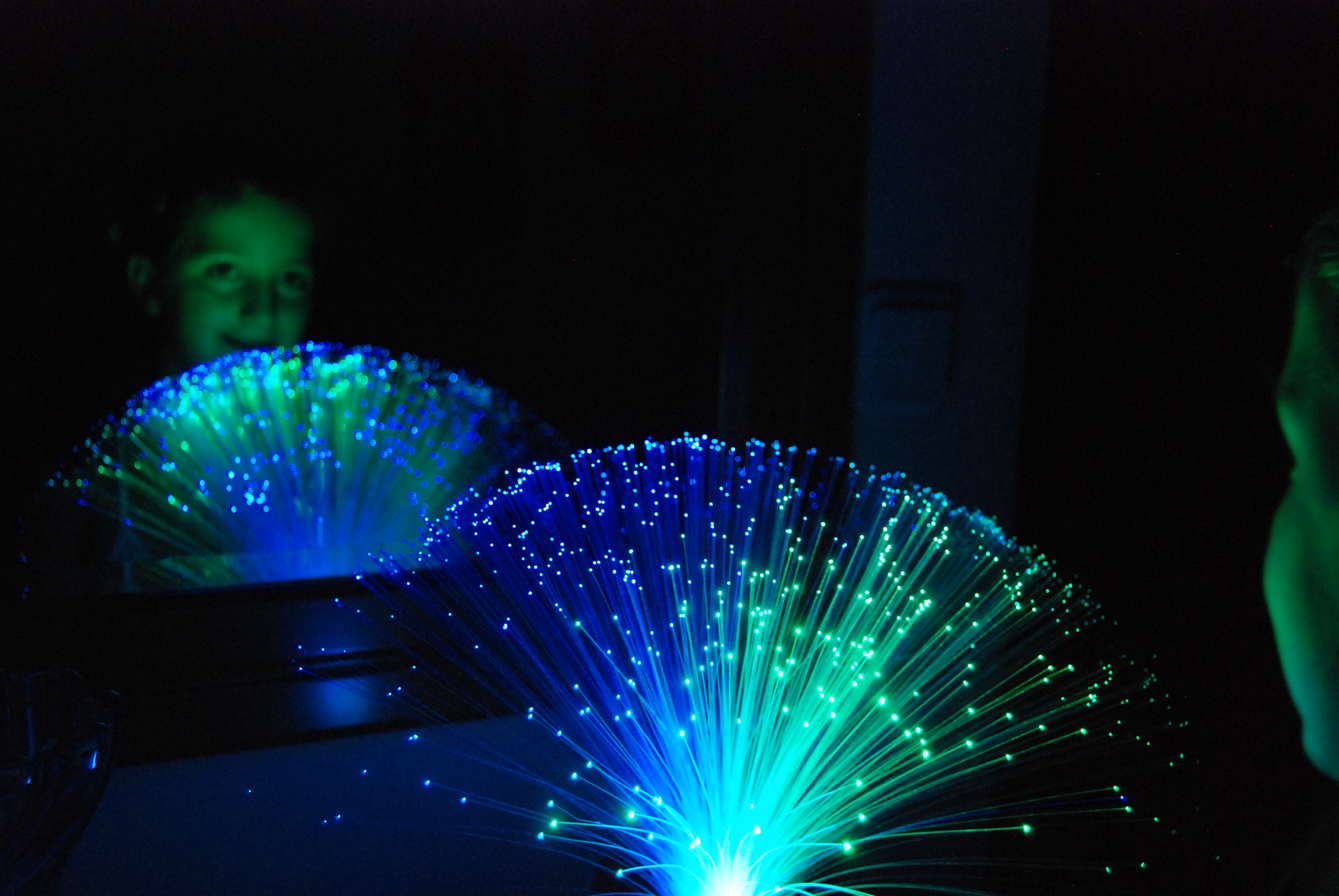
An optical fiber lamp

Optical fibers are used as light guides in medical and other applications where bright light needs to be shone on a target without a clear line-of-sight path. Many microscopes use fiber-optic light sources to provide intense illumination of samples being studied.

Optical-fiber lamps are used for illumination in decorative applications, including signs, art, toys and artificial Christmas trees. Optical fiber is an intrinsic part of the light-transmitting concrete building product LiTraCon.

==== Daylighting ====
In some buildings, optical fibers route sunlight from the roof to the interior of the building (daylighting). An optical fiber-based daylighting setup typically requires a parabolic collector to track the sun and concentrate its light into the fiber bundle. These setups use two kinds of fiber: Optical fibers intended for light transport need to propagate as much light as possible within the core, while optical fibers intended for light distribution are designed to let part of the light leak through their cladding.

==== Hybrid solar ====
Hybrid solar lighting (HSL) or hybrid lighting systems combine the use of solar with artificial light for interior illumination by channelling sunlight through fiber-optic cable bundles to provide solar light into rooms without windows or skylights, and by supplementing this natural light with artificial light—typically LED—as required.

The bundles are led from exterior/rooftop optical light collectors through small openings or cable ducts and carry the light to where it is needed. The optical fibers end in hybrid luminaires where the sunlight is joined with electric light, either on demand or to automatically maintain a constant light level even as the available sunlight decreases.

=== Sensors ===
Fibers have many uses in remote sensing. In some applications, the fiber itself is the sensor. In other cases, fiber is used to connect a sensor to a measurement system. Optical fibers can be used as sensors to measure strain, temperature, pressure, and other quantities by modifying a fiber so that the property being measured modulates the intensity, phase, polarization, wavelength, or transit time of light in the fiber. Sensors that vary the intensity of light are the simplest since only a simple source and detector are required. A particularly useful feature of such fiber optic sensors is that they can, if required, provide distributed sensing over distances of up to one meter. Distributed acoustic sensing is one example of this. Optical fiber can also be used in structural health monitoring. This type of sensor can detect stresses that may have a lasting impact on structures. It is based on the principle of measuring analog attenuation.

In contrast, highly localized measurements can be provided by integrating miniaturized sensing elements with the tip of the fiber. These can be implemented by various micro- and nanofabrication technologies, such that they do not exceed the microscopic boundary of the fiber tip, allowing for such applications as insertion into blood vessels via hypodermic needle.

Extrinsic fiber optic sensors use an optical fiber cable, normally a multi-mode one, to transmit modulated light from either a non-fiber optical sensor—or an electronic sensor connected to an optical transmitter. A major benefit of extrinsic sensors is their ability to reach otherwise inaccessible places. An example is the measurement of temperature inside jet engines by using a fiber to transmit radiation into a pyrometer outside the engine. Extrinsic sensors can be used in the same way to measure the internal temperature of electrical transformers, where the extreme electromagnetic fields present make other measurement techniques impossible. Extrinsic sensors measure vibration, rotation, displacement, velocity, acceleration, torque, and torsion. A solid-state version of the gyroscope, using the interference of light, has been developed. The fiber optic gyroscope (FOG) has no moving parts and exploits the Sagnac effect to detect mechanical rotation.

Common uses for fiber optic sensors include advanced intrusion detection security systems. The light is transmitted along a fiber optic sensor cable placed on a fence, pipeline, or communication cabling, and the returned signal is monitored and analyzed for disturbances. This return signal is digitally processed to detect disturbances and trip an alarm if an intrusion has occurred. Optical fibers are widely used as components of optical chemical sensors and optical biosensors.

=== Imaging ===
Optical fiber is also used in imaging optics. A coherent bundle of fibers is used, sometimes along with lenses, for a long, thin imaging device called an endoscope, which is used to view objects through a small hole. Medical endoscopes are used for minimally invasive exploratory or surgical procedures. Industrial endoscopes (see fiberscope or borescope) are used for inspecting anything hard to reach, such as jet engine interiors.

=== Power transmission ===
Optical fiber can be used to transmit power using a photovoltaic cell to convert the light into electricity. While this method of power transmission is not as efficient as conventional ones, it is especially useful in situations where it is desirable not to have a metallic conductor as in the case of use near MRI machines, which produce strong magnetic fields. Other examples are for powering electronics in high-powered antenna elements and measurement devices used in high-voltage transmission equipment.

=== Other uses ===
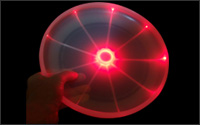
A frisbee illuminated by fiber optics

In spectroscopy, optical fiber bundles transmit light from a spectrometer to a substance that cannot be placed inside the spectrometer itself, in order to analyze its composition. A spectrometer analyzes substances by bouncing light off and through them. By using fibers, a spectrometer can be used to study objects remotely.

An optical fiber doped with certain rare-earth elements such as erbium can be used as the gain medium of a fiber laser or optical amplifier. Rare-earth-doped optical fibers can be used to provide signal amplification by splicing a short section of doped fiber into a regular (undoped) optical fiber line. The doped fiber is optically pumped with a second laser wavelength that is coupled into the line in addition to the signal wave. Both wavelengths of light are transmitted through the doped fiber, which transfers energy from the second pump wavelength to the signal wave. The process that causes the amplification is stimulated emission.

Optical fiber is also widely exploited as a nonlinear medium. The glass medium supports a host of nonlinear optical interactions, and the long interaction lengths possible in fiber facilitate a variety of phenomena, which are harnessed for applications and fundamental investigation. Conversely, fiber nonlinearity can have deleterious effects on optical signals, and measures are often required to minimize such unwanted effects. Optical fibers doped with a wavelength shifter collect scintillation light in physics experiments. Fiber-optic sights for handguns, rifles, and shotguns use pieces of optical fiber to improve the visibility of markings on the sight.

Optical fibers are used as components in e-textiles. This was first done by Harry Wainwright in the 1980s. He used fiber optics to create "a sweatshirt with a dragon spitting flames morphing into a bird."

== Principle of operation ==
An overview of the operating principles of the optical fiber

Optical fiber types

An optical fiber is a cylindrical dielectric waveguide (nonconducting waveguide) that transmits light along its axis through the process of total internal reflection. The fiber consists of a core surrounded by a cladding layer, both of which are made of dielectric materials. To confine the optical signal in the core, the refractive index of the core must be greater than that of the cladding. The boundary between the core and cladding may either be abrupt, in step-index fiber, or gradual, in graded-index fiber. Light can be fed into optical fibers using lasers or LEDs.

Optical fibers are immune to electrical interference as there is no cross-talk between signals in different cables and no pickup of environmental noise. Information traveling inside the optical fiber is even immune to electromagnetic pulses generated by nuclear devices. (Note: This feature is offset by the fiber's susceptibility to the gamma radiation from the weapon. The gamma radiation causes the optical attenuation to increase considerably during the gamma-ray burst due to the darkening of the material, followed by the fiber itself emitting a bright light flash as it anneals. How long the annealing takes and the level of the residual attenuation depends on the fiber material and its temperature. See Radiation effects on optical fibers)

Fiber cables do not conduct electricity, which makes them useful for protecting communications equipment in high voltage environments such as power generation facilities or applications prone to lightning strikes. The electrical isolation also prevents problems with ground loops. Because there is no electricity in optical cables that could potentially generate sparks, they can be used in environments where explosive fumes are present. Wiretapping (in this case, fiber tapping) is more difficult compared to electrical connections. Fiber cables are not targeted for metal theft. In contrast, copper cable systems use large amounts of copper and have been targeted since the 2000s commodities boom.

=== Refractive index ===
The refractive index is a way of measuring the speed of light in a material. Light travels fastest in a vacuum, such as in outer space. The speed of light in vacuum is about 300,000 kilometers (186,000 miles) per second. The refractive index of a medium is calculated by dividing the speed of light in vacuum by the speed of light in that medium. The refractive index of vacuum is therefore 1, by definition. A typical single-mode fiber used for telecommunications has a cladding made of pure silica, with an index of 1.444 at 1500 nm, and a core of doped silica with an index around 1.4475. The larger the index of refraction, the slower light travels in that medium. From this information, a simple rule of thumb is that a signal using optical fiber for communication will travel at around 200,000 kilometers per second. Thus, a phone call carried by fiber between Sydney and New York, a 16,000-kilometer distance, means that there is a minimum delay of 80 milliseconds (about $\tfrac {1}{12}$ of a second) between when one caller speaks and the other hears. (Note: The fiber, in this case, will probably travel a longer route, and there will be additional delays due to communication equipment switching and the process of encoding and decoding the voice onto the fiber.)

=== Total internal reflection ===
When light traveling in an optically dense medium hits a boundary at a steep angle of incidence (larger than the critical angle for the boundary), the light is completely reflected. This is called total internal reflection. This effect is used in optical fibers to confine light in the core. Most modern optical fiber is weakly guiding, meaning that the difference in refractive index between the core and the cladding is very small (typically less than 1%). Light travels through the fiber core, bouncing back and forth off the boundary between the core and cladding.

Because the light must strike the boundary with an angle greater than the critical angle, only light that enters the fiber within a certain range of angles can travel down the fiber without leaking out. This range of angles is called the acceptance cone of the fiber. There is a maximum angle from the fiber axis at which light may enter the fiber so that it will propagate, or travel, in the core of the fiber. The sine of this maximum angle is the numerical aperture (NA) of the fiber. Fiber with a larger NA requires less precision to splice and work with than fiber with a smaller NA. The size of this acceptance cone is a function of the refractive index difference between the fiber's core and cladding. Single-mode fiber has a small NA.

=== Multi-mode fiber ===
The propagation of light through a multi-mode optical fiber

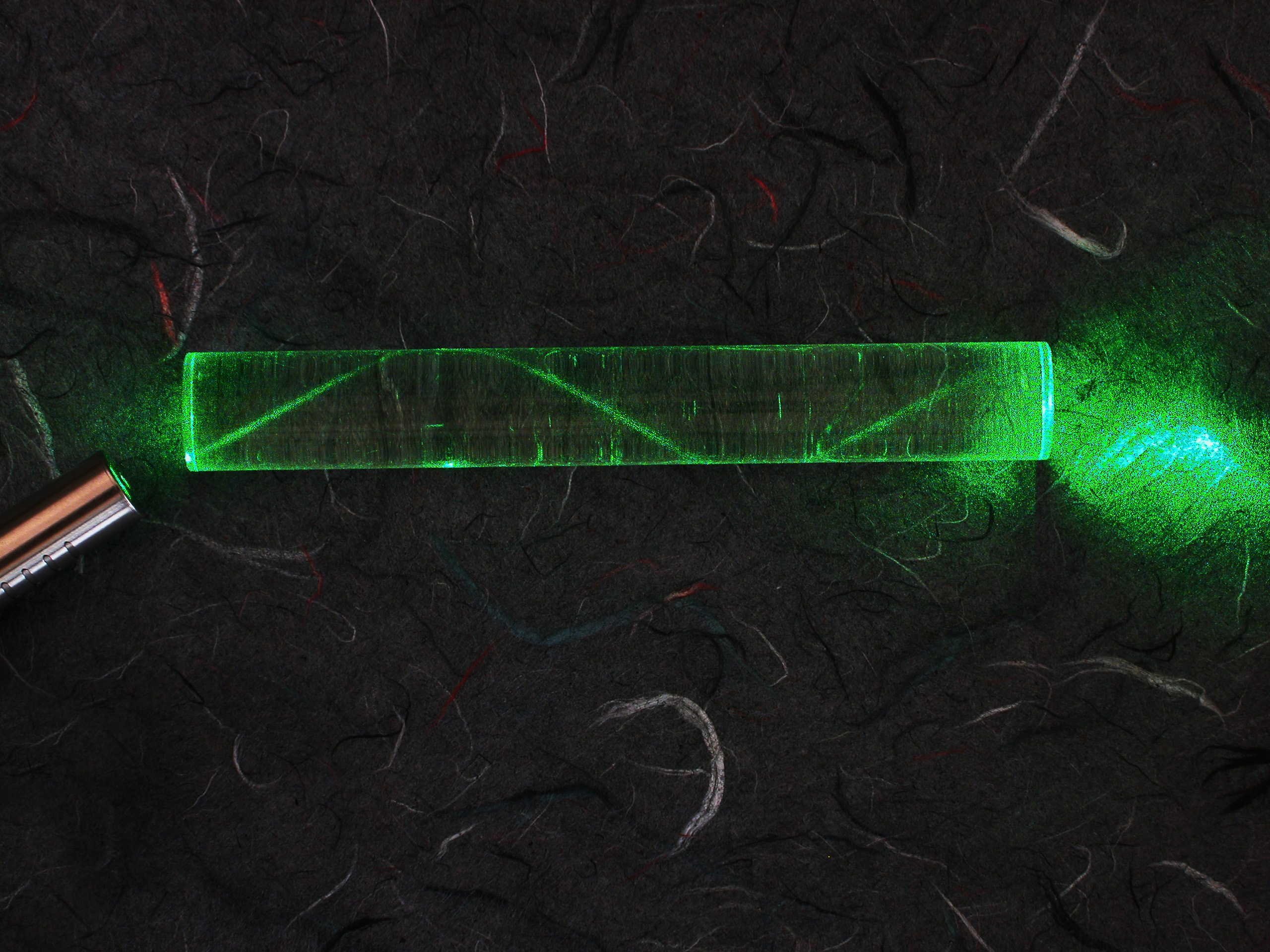
A laser bouncing down an acrylic rod, illustrating the total internal reflection of light in a multi-mode optical fiber

Optical fibers with a large core diameter (greater than 10 micrometers) may be analyzed by geometrical optics. Such fibers are called multi-mode fibers, from the electromagnetic analysis (see below). In a step-index multi-mode fiber, rays of light are guided along the fiber core by total internal reflection. Rays that meet the core-cladding boundary at an angle (measured relative to a line normal to the boundary) greater than the critical angle for this boundary are completely reflected. The critical angle is determined by the difference in the index of refraction between the core and cladding materials. Rays that meet the boundary at a low angle are refracted from the core into the cladding, where they terminate. The critical angle determines the acceptance angle of the fiber, often reported as a numerical aperture. A high numerical aperture allows light to propagate down the fiber in rays both close to the axis and at various angles, allowing efficient coupling of light into the fiber. However, this high numerical aperture increases the amount of dispersion as rays at different angles have different path lengths and therefore take different amounts of time to traverse the fiber.

In graded-index fiber, the index of refraction in the core decreases continuously between the axis and the cladding. This causes light rays to bend smoothly as they approach the cladding, rather than reflecting abruptly from the core-cladding boundary. The resulting curved paths reduce multi-path dispersion because high-angle rays pass more through the lower-index periphery of the core, rather than the high-index center. The index profile is chosen to minimize the difference in axial propagation speeds of the various rays in the fiber. This ideal index profile is very close to a parabolic relationship between the index and the distance from the axis.

=== Single-mode fiber ===
The structure of a typical single-mode fiber: 1. Core: 8 μm diameter; 2. Cladding: 125 μm dia.; 3. Buffer: 250 μm dia.; 4. Jacket: 400 μm dia.

Fibers with a core diameter less than about ten times the wavelength of the propagating light cannot be modeled using geometric optics. Instead, they must be analyzed as an electromagnetic waveguide structure, according to Maxwell's equations as reduced to the electromagnetic wave equation. (Note: The electromagnetic analysis may also be required to understand behaviors such as speckle that occur when coherent light propagates in multi-mode fiber.) As an optical waveguide, the fiber supports one or more confined transverse modes by which light can propagate along the fiber. Fiber supporting only one mode is called single-mode. (Note: The behavior of larger-core multi-mode fiber can also be modeled using the wave equation, which shows that such fiber supports more than one mode of propagation (hence the name). The results of such modeling of multi-mode fiber approximately agree with the predictions of geometric optics, if the fiber core is large enough to support more than a few modes.) The waveguide analysis shows that the light energy in the fiber is not completely confined in the core. Instead, especially in single-mode fibers, a significant fraction of the energy in the bound mode travels in the cladding as an evanescent wave. The most common type of single-mode fiber has a core diameter of 8–10 micrometers and is designed for use in the near infrared. Multi-mode fiber, by comparison, is manufactured with core diameters as small as 50 micrometers and as large as hundreds of micrometers.

=== Special-purpose fiber ===
Some special-purpose optical fiber is constructed with a non-cylindrical core or cladding layer, usually with an elliptical or rectangular cross-section. These include polarization-maintaining fiber used in fiber optic sensors and fiber designed to suppress whispering gallery mode propagation.

Photonic-crystal fiber is made with a regular pattern of index variation (often in the form of cylindrical holes that run along the length of the fiber). Such fiber uses diffraction effects instead of or in addition to total internal reflection to confine light to the fiber's core. The properties of the fiber can be tailored to a wide variety of applications.

== Mechanisms of attenuation ==
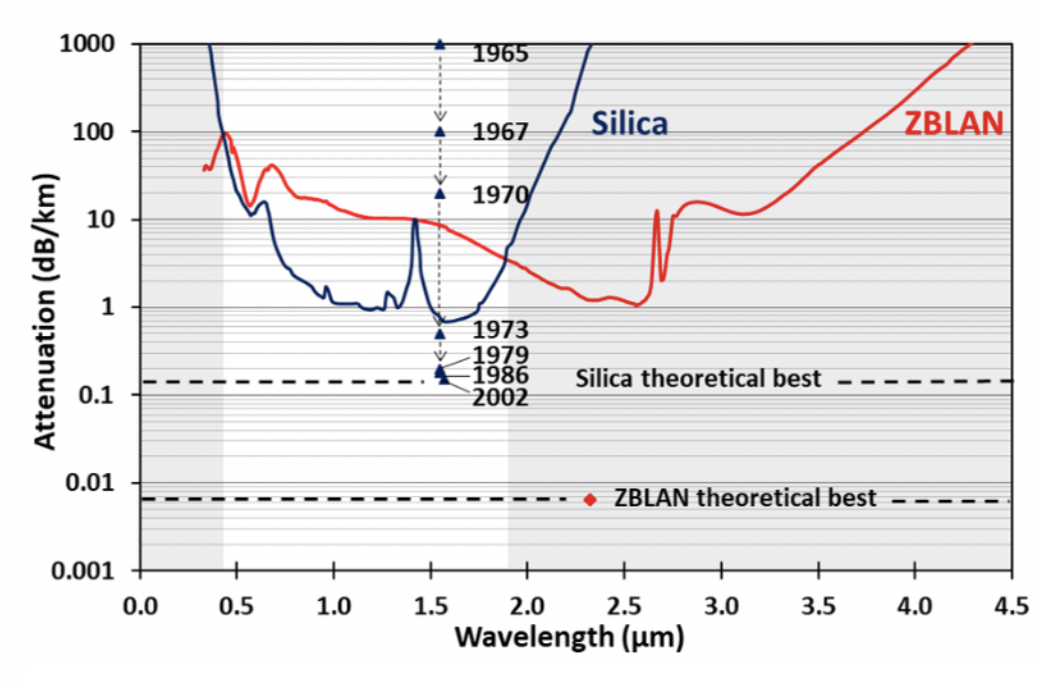
Experimental attenuation curve of low loss multimode silica and ZBLAN fiber. Black triangle points and gray arrows illustrate a four-order-of-magnitude reduction in the attenuation of silica optical fibers over four decades from ~1000 dB/km in 1965 to ~0.17 dB/km in 2005.

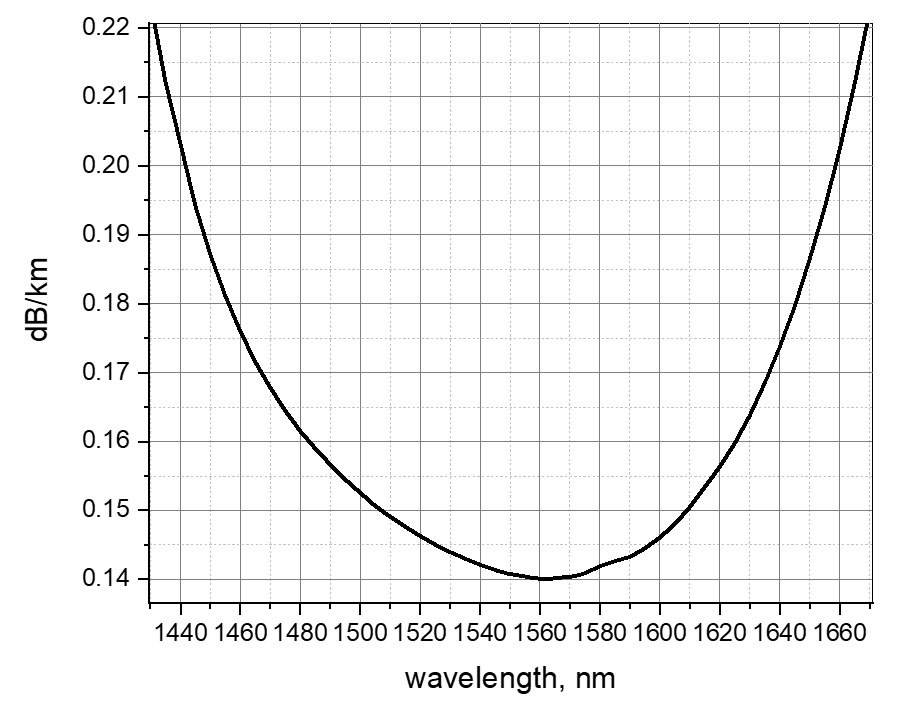
Experimentally measured spectral attenuation of silica core optical fiber. Minimum attenuation is 0.1400 dB/km at 1560 nm wavelength.

Attenuation in fiber optics, also known as transmission loss, is the reduction in the intensity of the light signal as it travels through the transmission medium. Attenuation coefficients in fiber optics are usually expressed in units of dB/km. The medium is usually a fiber of silica glass (Note: For applications requiring spectral wavelengths, especially in the mid-infrared wavelengths (~ 2–7 μm), a better alternative is represented by fluoride glasses such as ZBLAN and InF_{3}.) that confines the incident light beam within. Attenuation is an important factor limiting the transmission of a digital signal across large distances. Thus, much research has gone into both limiting the attenuation and maximizing the amplification of the optical signal. The four orders of magnitude reduction in the attenuation of silica optical fibers over four decades was the result of constant improvement of manufacturing processes, raw material purity, preform, and fiber designs, which allowed for these fibers to approach the theoretical lower limit of attenuation.

Single-mode optical fibers can be made with extremely low loss. Corning's Vascade® EX2500 fiber, a low-loss single-mode fiber for telecommunications wavelengths, has a nominal attenuation of 0.148 dB/km at 1550 nm. A 10 km length of such fiber transmits nearly 71% of optical energy at 1550 nm.

Attenuation in optical fiber is caused primarily by both scattering and absorption. In fibers based on fluoride glasses such as ZBLAN, minimum attenuation is limited by impurity absorption. The vast majority of optical fibers are based on silica glass, where impurity absorption is negligible. In silica fibers attenuation is determined by intrinsic mechanisms: Rayleigh scattering and infrared absorption in the glasses through which the light is propagating. Absorption in silica increases steeply at wavelengths above 1570 nm. At wavelengths most useful for telecommunications, Rayleigh scattering is the dominant loss mechanism. At 1550 nm, attenuation components for a record-low-loss fiber are given as follows: Rayleigh scattering loss: 0.1200 dB/km, infrared absorption loss: 0.0150 dB/km, impurity absorption loss: 0.0047 dB/km, waveguide imperfection loss: 0.0010 dB/km.

=== Light scattering ===
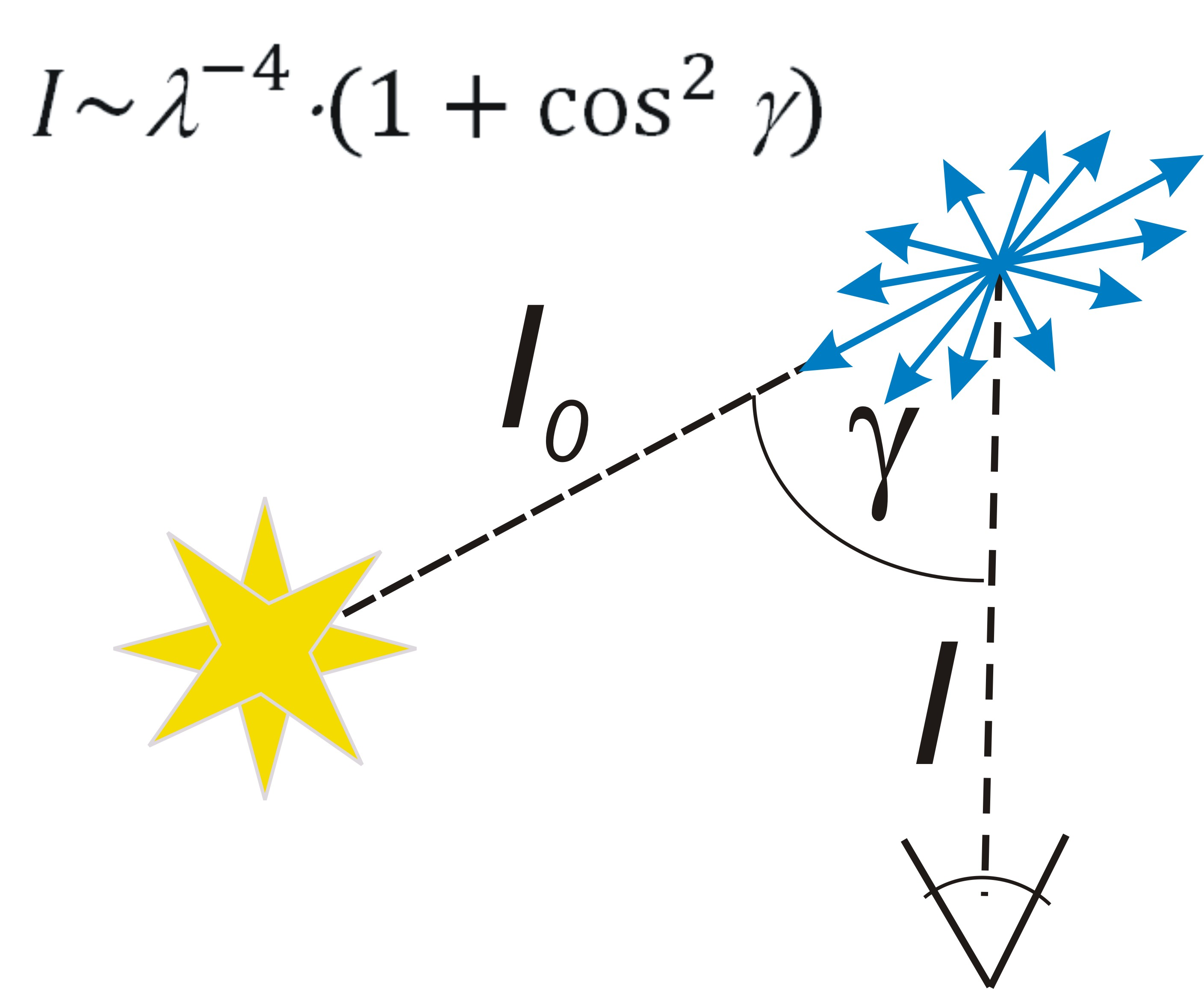
Angular dependence of Rayleigh scattering

The propagation of light through the core of an optical fiber is based on the total internal reflection of the light wave, in terms of geometric optics, or guided modes, in terms of an electromagnetic waveguide. In a typical single-mode optical fiber, about 75% of the light is propagating through the core material, having a higher refractive index, and about 25% of the light is propagating through the cladding, having a lower refractive index. The interface between the core and cladding glasses is exceptionally smooth and does not give rise to a significant scattering loss or a waveguide imperfection loss. The scattering loss originates primarily from the Rayleigh scattering in the bulk of the glasses composing the fiber core and cladding.

The scattering of light in optical quality glass fiber is caused by molecular-level irregularities (compositional fluctuations) in the glass structure. Indeed, one emerging school of thought is that glass is simply the limiting case of a polycrystalline solid. Within this framework, domains exhibiting various degrees of short-range order become the building blocks of metals as well as glasses and ceramics. Distributed both between and within these domains are microstructural defects that provide the most ideal locations for light scattering.

Scattering depends on the wavelength of the light being scattered and on the size of the scattering centers. The angular dependence of the light intensity scattered from an optical fiber matches that of Rayleigh scattering, indicating that the scattering centers are much smaller than the wavelength of propagating light. It originates from the density fluctuations driven by the fictive temperature of the glass, and from the concentration fluctuations of dopants in both the core and the cladding. Rayleigh scattering coefficient, R, can be presented as :
$$R = R_\text{d} + R_\text{c}$$
where R_{d} represents Rayleigh scattering on density fluctuations and R_{c} represents Rayleigh scattering on dopant concentration fluctuations. Dopants, such as germanium dioxide or fluorine, are used to create the refractive index difference between the core and the cladding to form a waveguide structure.
$$R_\text{d} = \frac{8 \pi^3}{3 \lambda^4} n^8 p^2 \beta_\text{c} k_\text{B} T_\text{f}$$
where λ is wavelength, n is refractive index, p is photo-elastic coefficient, β_{c} is isothermal compressibility, k_{B} is the Boltzmann constant, T_{f} is fictive temperature. The only physically significant variable affecting scattering on density fluctuations is the fictive temperature of the glass; a lower fictive temperature results in a more homogeneous glass and lower Rayleigh scattering. Fictive temperature may be dramatically reduced by about 100 wt. ppm of alkali oxide dopant in the fiber core, as well as slower cooling of the fiber during the fiber draw process. These approaches are used to produce optical fibers with the lowest attenuation, especially those for submarine telecom cables.

For small dopant concentrations, R_{c} is proportional to x(dn/dx)^{2}, where x is the mole fraction of the dopant in SiO_{2}-based glass and n is the refractive index of the glass. When GeO_{2} dopant is used to increase the refractive index of the fiber core, it increases the concentration fluctuation component of Rayleigh scattering and attenuation of the fiber. This is why the lowest attenuation fibers do not use GeO_{2} in the core, and use fluorine in the cladding, to reduce the refractive index of the cladding. R_{c} in pure silica core fiber is proportional to the overlap integral between LP01 mode and fluorine-induced concentration fluctuation component in the cladding.

In the core of potassium-doped pure silica-core (KPSC) fiber only density fluctuations play a significant role, as the concentrations of K_{2}O, fluorine and chlorine are very low. The density fluctuations in the core are moderated by lower fictive temperature resulting from potassium doping, and are further reduced by annealing during the fiber draw process. This differs from the cladding, where higher fluorine dopant levels and the resulting concentration fluctuations add to the loss. In such fibers, the light travelling through the core experiences lower scattering and lower attenuation compared to the light propagating through the cladding segment of the fiber.

At high optical powers, scattering can also be caused by nonlinear optical processes in the fiber.

=== UV-Vis-IR absorption ===
In addition to light scattering, attenuation or signal loss can also occur due to selective absorption of specific wavelengths. Primary material considerations include both electrons and molecules as follows:

- At the electronic level, it depends on whether the electron orbitals are spaced (or "quantized") such that they can absorb a quantum of light (or photon) of a specific wavelength or frequency in the ultraviolet (UV) or visible ranges. This is what gives rise to color.
- At the atomic or molecular level, it depends on the frequencies of atomic or molecular vibrations or chemical bonds, how closely packed its atoms or molecules are, and whether or not the atoms or molecules exhibit long-range order. These factors will determine the capacity of the material to transmit longer wavelengths in the infrared (IR), far IR, radio, and microwave ranges.

The design of any optically transparent device requires the selection of materials based upon knowledge of their properties and limitations. The crystal structure absorption characteristics observed at the lower frequency regions (mid- to far-IR wavelength range) define the long-wavelength transparency limit of the material. They are the result of the interactive coupling between the motions of thermally induced vibrations of the constituent atoms and molecules of the solid lattice and the incident light wave radiation. Hence, all materials are bounded by limiting regions of absorption caused by atomic and molecular vibrations (bond-stretching) in the far-infrared (>10 μm).

In other words, the selective absorption of IR light by a particular material occurs because the selected frequency of the light wave matches the frequency (or an integer multiple of the frequency, i.e., harmonic) at which the particles of that material vibrate. Since different atoms and molecules have different natural frequencies of vibration, they will selectively absorb different frequencies (or portions of the spectrum) of IR light.

Reflection and transmission of light waves occur because the frequencies of the light waves do not match the natural resonant frequencies of vibration of the objects. When IR light of these frequencies strikes an object, the energy is either reflected or transmitted.

=== Loss budget ===
Attenuation over a cable run is significantly increased by the inclusion of connectors and splices. When computing the acceptable attenuation (loss budget) between a transmitter and a receiver, one includes:

- dB loss due to the type and length of fiber optic cable,
- dB loss introduced by connectors, and
- dB loss introduced by splices.

Connectors typically introduce 0.3 dB per connector on well-polished connectors. Splices typically introduce less than 0.2 dB per splice.

The total loss can be calculated by:

Loss = dB loss per connector × number of connectors + dB loss per splice × number of splices + dB loss per kilometer × kilometers of fiber,

where the dB loss per kilometer is a function of the type of fiber and can be found in the manufacturer's specifications. For example, a typical 1550 nm single-mode fiber has a loss of 0.3 dB per kilometer.

The calculated loss budget is used when testing to confirm that the measured loss is within the normal operating parameters.

== Manufacturing ==
=== Materials ===
Glass optical fibers are almost always made from silica, but some other materials, such as fluorozirconate, fluoroaluminate, and chalcogenide glasses as well as crystalline materials like sapphire, are used for longer-wavelength infrared or other specialized applications. Silica and fluoride glasses usually have refractive indices of about 1.5, but some materials such as the chalcogenides can have indices as high as 3. Typically, the index difference between core and cladding is less than one percent.

Plastic optical fibers (POF) are commonly step-index multi-mode fibers with a core diameter of 0.5 millimeters or larger. POF typically have higher attenuation coefficients than glass fibers, 1 dB/m or higher, and this high attenuation limits the range of POF-based systems.

==== Silica ====
Silica exhibits fairly good optical transmission over a wide range of wavelengths. In the near-infrared (near IR) portion of the spectrum, particularly around 1.5 μm, silica can have extremely low absorption and scattering losses of the order of 0.2 dB/km. Such low losses depend on using ultra-pure silica. A high transparency in the 1.4-μm region is achieved by maintaining a low concentration of hydroxyl groups (OH). Alternatively, a high OH concentration is better for transmission in the ultraviolet (UV) region.

Silica can be drawn into fibers at reasonably high temperatures and has a fairly broad glass transformation range. One other advantage is that fusion splicing and cleaving of silica fibers is relatively effective. Silica fiber also has high mechanical strength against both pulling and even bending, provided that the fiber is not too thick and that the surfaces have been well prepared during processing. Even simple cleaving of the ends of the fiber can provide nicely flat surfaces with acceptable optical quality. Silica is also relatively chemically inert. In particular, it is not hygroscopic (does not absorb water).

Silica glass can be doped with various materials. One purpose of doping is to raise the refractive index (e.g. with germanium dioxide (GeO_{2}) or aluminium oxide (Al_{2}O_{3})) or to lower it (e.g. with fluorine or boron trioxide (B_{2}O_{3})). Doping is also possible with laser-active ions (for example, rare-earth-doped fibers) in order to obtain active fibers to be used, for example, in fiber amplifiers or laser applications. Both the fiber core and cladding are typically doped, so that the entire assembly (core and cladding) is effectively the same compound (e.g., an aluminosilicate, germanosilicate, phosphosilicate or borosilicate glass).

Particularly for active fibers, pure silica is usually not a very suitable host glass, because it exhibits a low solubility for rare-earth ions. This can lead to quenching effects due to the clustering of dopant ions. Aluminosilicates are much more effective in this respect. Silica fiber also exhibits a high threshold for optical damage. This property ensures a low tendency for laser-induced breakdown. This is important for fiber amplifiers when utilized for the amplification of short pulses.

Because of these properties, silica fibers are the material of choice in many optical applications, such as communications (except for very short distances with plastic optical fiber), fiber lasers, fiber amplifiers, and fiber-optic sensors. Large efforts put forth in the development of various types of silica fibers have further increased the performance of such fibers over other materials.

==== Fluoride glass ====
Fluoride glass is a class of non-oxide optical quality glasses composed of fluorides of various metals. Because of the low viscosity of these glasses, it is very difficult to completely avoid crystallization while processing them through the glass transition (or drawing the fiber from the melt). Thus, although heavy metal fluoride glasses (HMFG) exhibit very low optical attenuation, they are not only difficult to manufacture, but are also quite fragile and have poor resistance to moisture and other environmental attacks. Their best attribute is that they lack the absorption band associated with the hydroxyl (OH) group (3,200–3,600 cm^{−1}; i.e., 2,777–3,125 nm or 2.78–3.13 μm), which is present in nearly all oxide-based glasses. Such low losses were never realized in practice, and the fragility and high cost of fluoride fibers made them less than ideal as primary candidates.

Fluoride fibers are used in mid-IR spectroscopy, fiber optic sensors, thermometry, and imaging. Fluoride fibers can be used for guided lightwave transmission in media such as YAG (yttrium aluminium garnet) lasers at 2.9 μm, as required for medical applications (e.g. ophthalmology and dentistry).

An example of a heavy metal fluoride glass is the ZBLAN glass group, composed of zirconium, barium, lanthanum, aluminium, and sodium fluorides. Their main technological application is as optical waveguides in both planar and fiber forms. They are advantageous especially in the mid-infrared (2,000–5,000 nm) range.

==== Phosphate glass ====
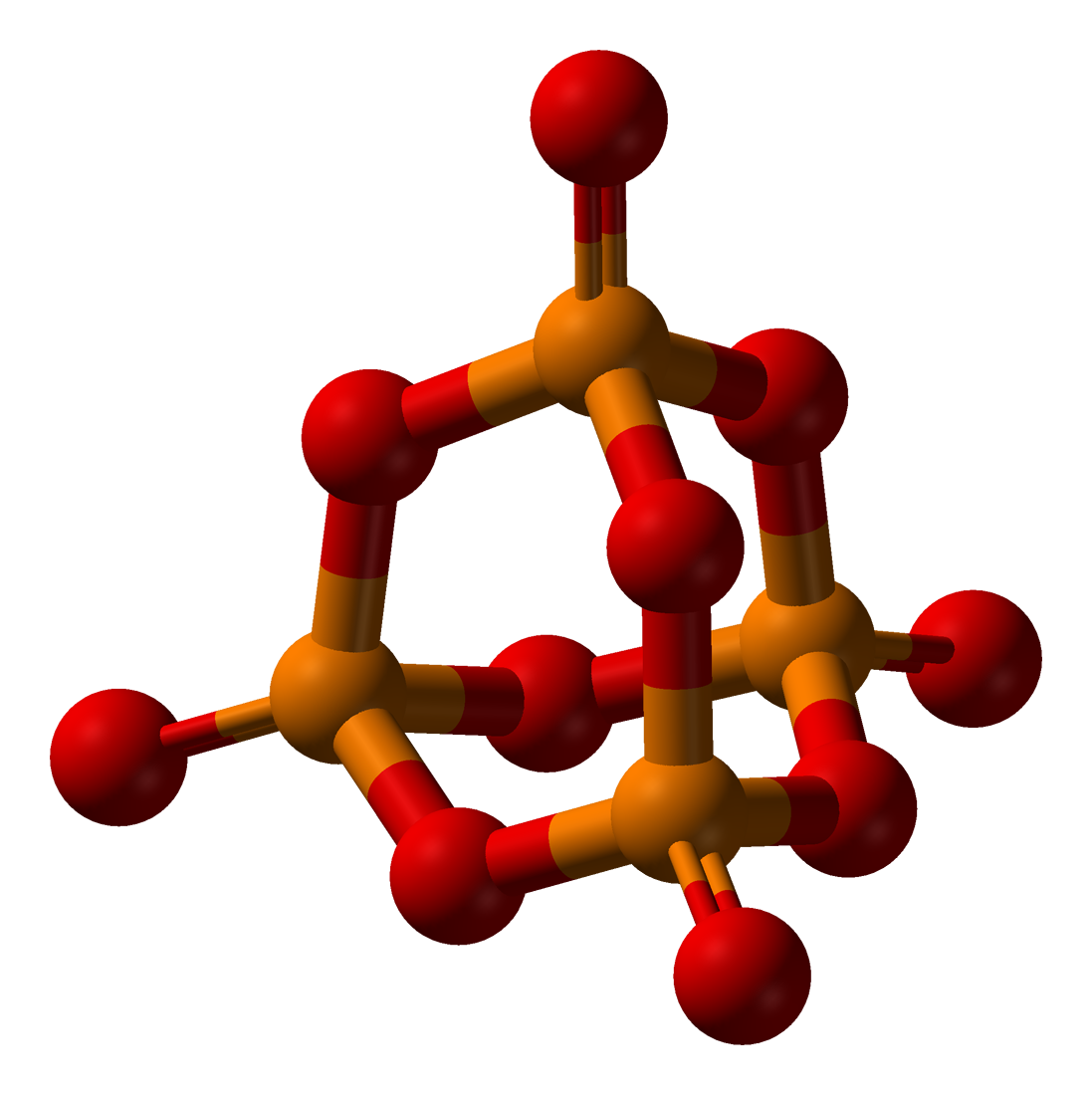
The P_{4}O_{10} cagelike structure—the basic building block for phosphate glass

Phosphate glass is a class of optical glasses composed of metaphosphates of various metals. Instead of the SiO_{4} tetrahedra in the network solid structure of silicate glasses, the building block for this glass is phosphorus pentoxide (P_{2}O_{5}), which crystallizes in at least four different forms. The most familiar polymorph is the cagelike structure of P_{4}O_{10}.

Phosphate glasses can be advantageous over silica glasses for optical fibers with a high concentration of doping rare-earth ions. A mix of fluoride glass and phosphate glass is fluorophosphate glass.

==== Chalcogenide glass ====
The chalcogens—the elements in group 16 of the periodic table—particularly sulfur (S), selenium (Se) and tellurium (Te)—react with more electropositive elements, such as silver, to form chalcogenides. These are extremely versatile compounds, in that they can be crystalline or amorphous, metallic or semiconducting, and conductors of ions or electrons. Chalcogenide glass can be used to make fibers for far-infrared transmission.

=== Process ===
Illustration of the modified chemical vapor deposition (inside) process

==== Preform ====
Standard optical fibers are made by first constructing a large-diameter preform with a carefully controlled refractive index profile, and then pulling the preform to form the long, thin optical fiber. The preform is commonly made by three chemical vapor deposition methods: inside vapor deposition, outside vapor deposition, and vapor axial deposition. With inside vapor deposition, the preform starts as a hollow glass tube approximately 40 centimeters (16 in) long, which is placed horizontally and rotated slowly on a lathe. Gases such as silicon tetrachloride (SiCl_{4}) or germanium tetrachloride (GeCl_{4}) are injected with oxygen in the end of the tube. The gases are then heated by means of an external hydrogen burner, bringing the temperature of the gas up to 1,900 K (1,600 °C, 3,000 °F), where the tetrachlorides react with oxygen to produce silica or germanium dioxide particles. When the reaction conditions are chosen to allow this reaction to occur in the gas phase throughout the tube volume, in contrast to earlier techniques where the reaction occurred only on the glass surface, this technique is called modified chemical vapor deposition. The oxide particles then agglomerate to form large particle chains, which subsequently deposit on the walls of the tube as soot. The deposition is due to the large difference in temperature between the gas core and the wall, causing the gas to push the particles outward in a process known as thermophoresis. The torch is then traversed up and down the length of the tube to deposit the material evenly. After the torch has reached the end of the tube, it is then brought back to the beginning of the tube, and the deposited particles are then melted to form a solid layer. This process is repeated until a sufficient amount of material has been deposited. For each layer, the composition can be modified by varying the gas composition, resulting in precise control of the finished fiber's optical properties. In outside vapor deposition or vapor axial deposition, the glass is formed by flame hydrolysis, a reaction in which silicon tetrachloride and germanium tetrachloride are oxidized by reaction with water in an oxyhydrogen flame. In outside vapor deposition, the glass is deposited onto a solid rod, which is removed before further processing. In vapor axial deposition, a short seed rod is used, and a porous preform, whose length is not limited by the size of the source rod, is built up on its end. The porous preform is consolidated into a transparent, solid preform by heating to about 1,800 K (1,500 °C, 2,800 °F).

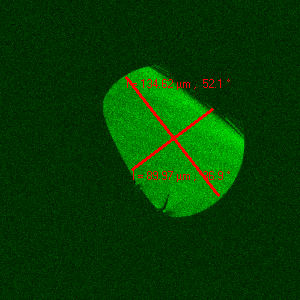
Cross-section of a fiber drawn from a D-shaped preform. The preform for this test fiber was not polished well, and cracks are seen with the confocal optical microscope.

Typical communications fiber uses a circular preform. For some applications such as double-clad fibers another form is preferred. In fiber lasers based on double-clad fiber, an asymmetric shape improves the filling factor for laser pumping.

Because of the surface tension, the shape is smoothed during the drawing process, and the shape of the resulting fiber does not reproduce the sharp edges of the preform. Nevertheless, careful polishing of the preform is important, since any defects of the preform surface affect the optical and mechanical properties of the resulting fiber.

==== Drawing ====
The preform, regardless of construction, is placed in a device known as a drawing tower, where the preform tip is heated and the optical fiber is pulled out as a string. The tension on the fiber can be controlled to maintain the desired fiber thickness.

=== Cladding ===
The light is guided down the core of the fiber by an optical cladding with a lower refractive index that traps light in the core through total internal reflection. For some types of fiber, the cladding is made of glass and is drawn along with the core from a preform with radially varying index of refraction. For other types of fiber, the cladding is made of plastic and is applied like a coating (see below).

=== Coatings ===
The cladding is coated by a buffer (not to be confused with an actual buffer tube) that protects it from moisture and physical damage. These coatings are UV-cured urethane acrylate composite or polyimide materials applied to the outside of the fiber during the drawing process. The coatings protect the very delicate strands of glass fiber—about the size of a human hair—and allow it to survive the rigors of manufacturing, proof testing, cabling, and installation. The buffer coating must be stripped off the fiber for termination or splicing.

Today's glass optical fiber draw processes employ a dual-layer coating approach. An inner primary coating is designed to act as a shock absorber to minimize attenuation caused by microbending. An outer secondary coating protects the primary coating against mechanical damage and acts as a barrier to lateral forces, and may be colored to differentiate strands in bundled cable constructions. These fiber optic coating layers are applied during the fiber draw, at speeds approaching 100 kilometers per hour (60 mph). Fiber optic coatings are applied using one of two methods: wet-on-dry and wet-on-wet. In wet-on-dry, the fiber passes through a primary coating application, which is then UV cured, then through the secondary coating application, which is subsequently cured. In wet-on-wet, the fiber passes through both the primary and secondary coating applications, then goes to UV curing.

The thickness of the coating is taken into account when calculating the stress that the fiber experiences under different bend configurations. When a coated fiber is wrapped around a mandrel, the stress experienced by the fiber is given by
$$\sigma = E {d_\text{f} \over d_\text{m} + d_\text{c}},$$
where E is the fiber's Young's modulus, d_{m} is the diameter of the mandrel, d_{f} is the diameter of the cladding and d_{c} is the diameter of the coating.

In a two-point bend configuration, a coated fiber is bent in a U-shape and placed between the grooves of two faceplates, which are brought together until the fiber breaks. The stress in the fiber in this configuration is given by
$$\sigma = 1.198E {d_\text{f} \over d - d_\text{c}},$$
where d is the distance between the faceplates. The coefficient 1.198 is a geometric constant associated with this configuration.

Fiber optic coatings protect the glass fibers from scratches that could lead to strength degradation. The combination of moisture and scratches accelerates the aging and deterioration of fiber strength. When fiber is subjected to low stresses over a long period, fiber fatigue can occur. Over time or in extreme conditions, these factors combine to cause microscopic flaws in the glass fiber to propagate, which can ultimately result in fiber failure.

Three key characteristics of fiber optic waveguides can be affected by environmental conditions: strength, attenuation, and resistance to losses caused by microbending. External optical fiber cable jackets and buffer tubes protect glass optical fiber from environmental conditions that can affect the fiber's performance and long-term durability. On the inside, coatings ensure the reliability of the signal being carried and help minimize attenuation due to microbending.

=== Cable construction ===
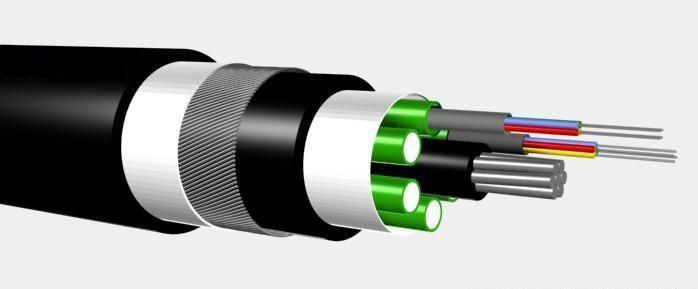
An optical fiber cable

In practical fibers, the cladding is usually coated with a tough resin and features an additional buffer layer, which may be further surrounded by a jacket layer, usually plastic. These layers add strength to the fiber but do not affect its optical properties. Rigid fiber assemblies sometimes put light-absorbing glass between the fibers to prevent light that leaks out of one fiber from entering another. This reduces crosstalk between the fibers, or reduces flare in fiber bundle imaging applications. Multi-fiber cable usually uses colored buffers to identify each strand.

Modern cables come in a wide variety of sheathings and armor, designed for applications such as direct burial in trenches, high voltage isolation, dual use as power lines, installation in conduit, lashing to aerial telephone poles, submarine installation, and insertion in paved streets.

Some fiber optic cable versions are reinforced with aramid yarns or glass yarns as an intermediary strength member. In commercial terms, the use of glass yarns is more cost-efficient with no loss of mechanical durability. Glass yarns also protect the cable core against rodents and termites.

== Practical issues ==
=== Installation ===
Fiber cable can be very flexible, but traditional fiber's loss increases greatly if the fiber is bent with a radius smaller than around 30 mm. This creates a problem when the cable is bent around corners. Bendable fibers, targeted toward easier installation in home environments, have been standardized as ITU-T G.657. This type of fiber can be bent with a radius as low as 7.5 mm without adverse impact. Even more bendable fibers have been developed. Bendable fiber may also be resistant to fiber hacking, in which the signal in a fiber is surreptitiously monitored by bending the fiber and detecting the leakage.

Another important feature of cable is its ability to withstand tension, which determines how much force can be applied to the cable during installation.

=== Termination and splicing ===
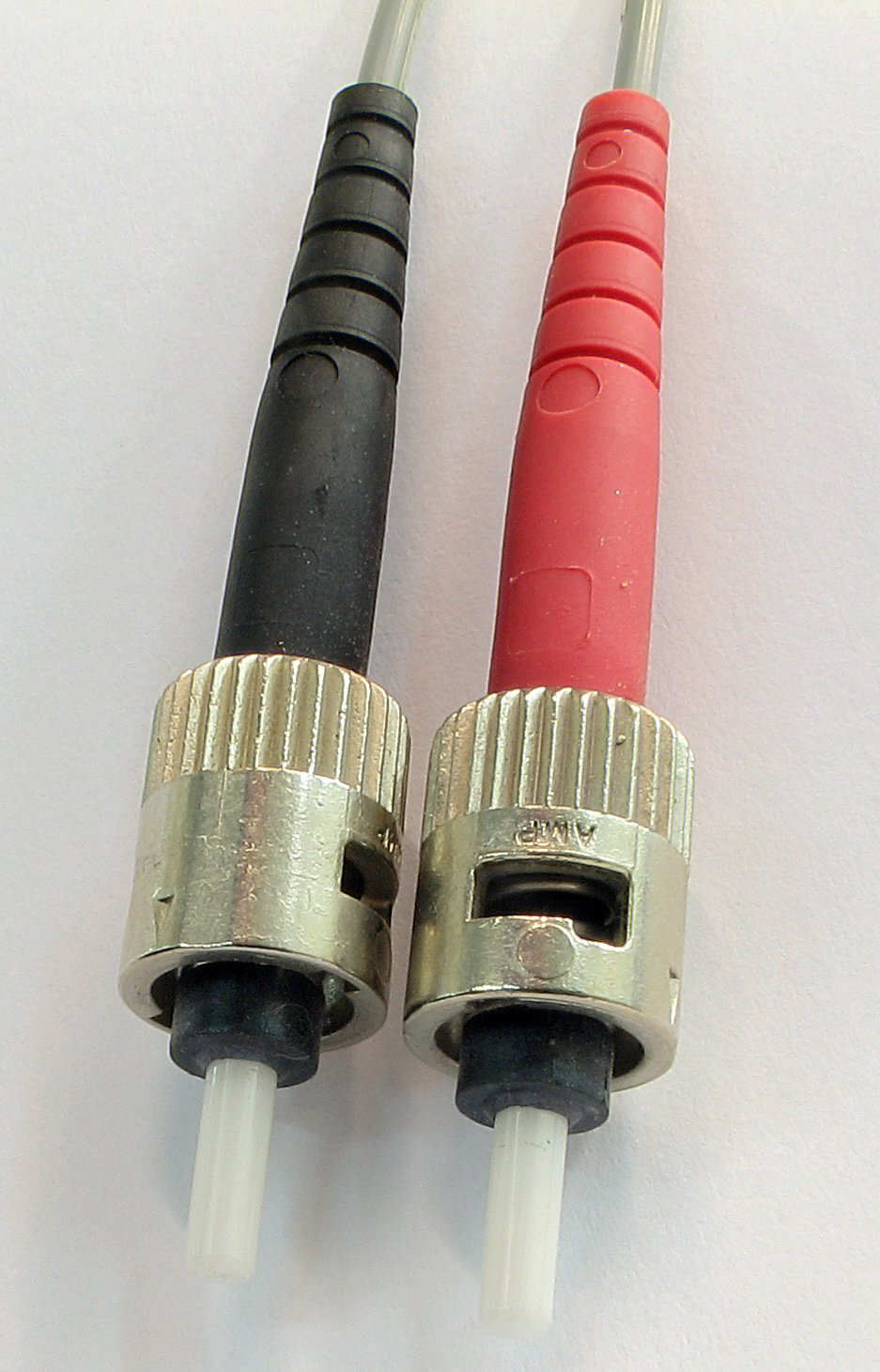
ST connectors on multi-mode fiber

Optical fibers are connected to terminal equipment by optical fiber connectors. These connectors are usually of a standard type such as FC, SC, ST, LC, MTRJ, MPO or SMA. Optical fibers may be connected by connectors, typically on a patch panel, or permanently by splicing, that is, joining two fibers together to form a continuous optical waveguide. The generally accepted splicing method is fusion splicing, which melts the fiber ends together. For quicker fastening jobs, a mechanical splice is used. All splicing techniques involve installing an enclosure that protects the splice.

Fusion splicing is done with a specialized instrument. The fiber ends are first stripped of their protective polymer coating (as well as the more sturdy outer jacket, if present). The ends are cleaved with a precision cleaver to make them perpendicular, and are placed into special holders in the fusion splicer. The splice is usually inspected via a magnified viewing screen to check the cleaves before and the fusion after the splice. The splicer uses small motors to align the end faces together, and emits a small spark between electrodes at the gap to burn off dust and moisture. Then the splicer generates a larger spark that raises the temperature above the melting point of the glass, fusing the ends permanently. The location and energy of the spark are carefully controlled so that the molten core and cladding do not mix, and this minimizes optical loss. A splice loss estimate is measured by the splicer by directing light through the cladding on one side and measuring the light leaking from the cladding on the other side. A splice loss under 0.1 dB is typical. The complexity of this process makes fiber splicing much more difficult than splicing copper wire.

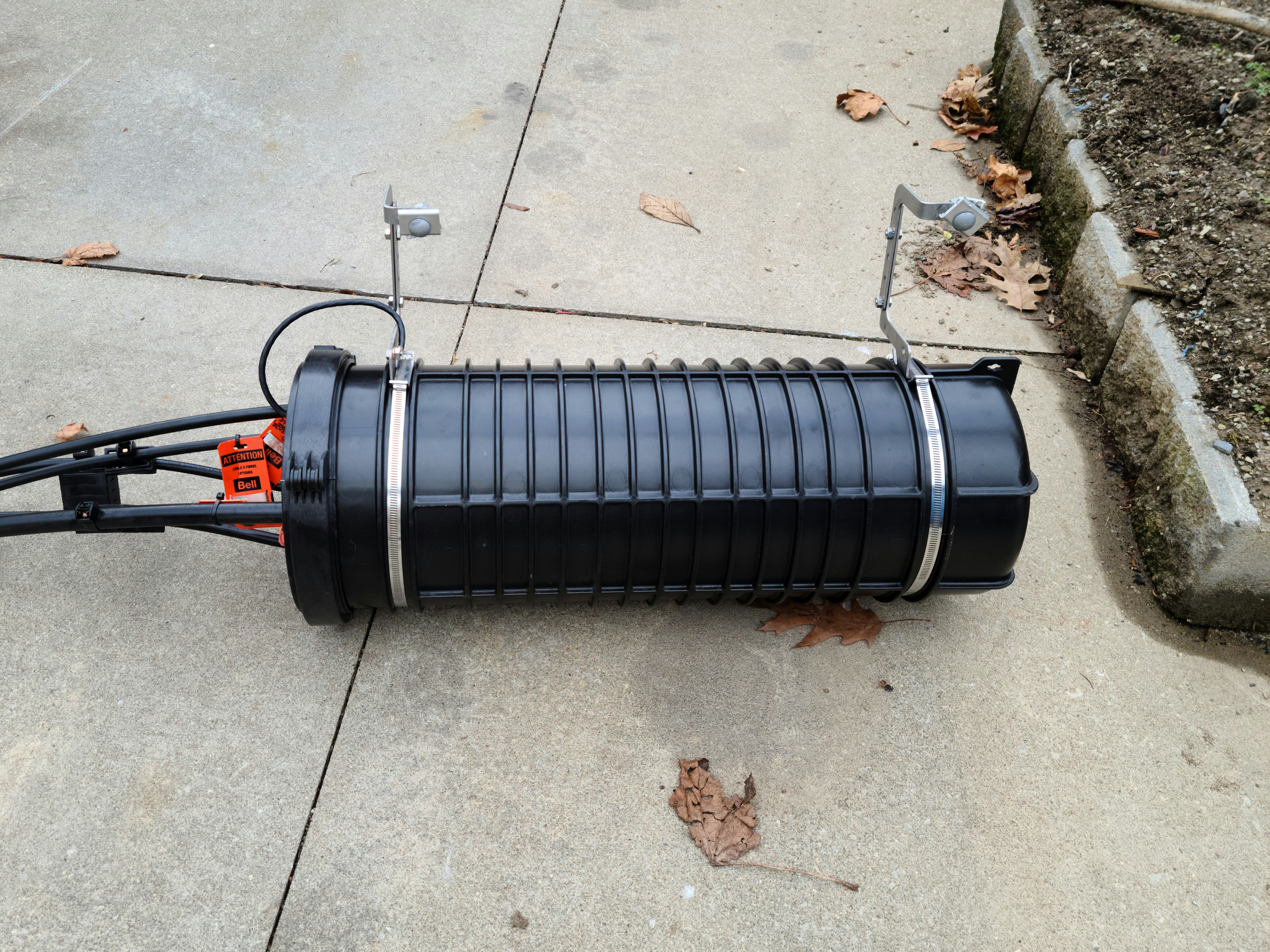
An aerial optical fiber splice enclosure lowered during installation. The individual fibers are fused and stored within the enclosure for protection from damage.

Mechanical fiber splices are designed to be quicker and easier to install, but there is still a need for stripping, careful cleaning, and precision cleaving. The fiber ends are aligned and held together by a precision sleeve, often using a clear index-matching gel that enhances the transmission of light across the joint. Mechanical splices typically have a higher optical loss and are less robust than fusion splices, especially if the gel is used.

Fibers are terminated in connectors that hold the fiber end precisely and securely. An optical fiber connector is a rigid cylindrical barrel surrounded by a sleeve that holds the barrel in its mating socket. The mating mechanism can be push and click, turn and latch (bayonet mount), or screw-in (threaded). The barrel is typically free to move within the sleeve and may have a key that prevents the barrel and fiber from rotating as the connectors are mated.

A typical connector is installed by preparing the fiber end and inserting it into the rear of the connector body. Quick-set adhesive is usually used to hold the fiber securely, and a strain relief is secured to the rear. Once the adhesive sets, the fiber's end is polished. Various polish profiles are used, depending on the type of fiber and the application. The resulting signal strength loss is called gap loss. For single-mode fiber, fiber ends are typically polished with a slight curvature that makes the mated connectors touch only at their cores. This is called a physical contact (PC) polish. The curved surface may be polished at an angle to make an angled physical contact (APC) connection. Such connections have higher loss than PC connections but greatly reduced back reflection because light that reflects from the angled surface leaks out of the fiber core. APC fiber ends have low back reflection even when disconnected.

In the 1990s, the number of parts per connector, polishing of the fibers, and the need to oven-bake the epoxy in each connector made terminating fiber optic cables difficult. Today, connector types on the market offer easier, less labor-intensive ways of terminating cables. Some of the most popular connectors are pre-polished at the factory and include a gel inside the connector. A cleave is made at the required length to get as close to the polished piece already inside the connector. The gel surrounds the point where the two pieces meet inside the connector for very little light loss. For the most demanding installations, factory pre-polished pigtails of sufficient length to reach the first fusion splice enclosure assures good performance and minimizes on-site labor.

=== Free-space coupling ===
It is often necessary to align an optical fiber with another optical fiber or with an optoelectronic device such as a light-emitting diode, a laser diode, or a modulator. This can involve either carefully aligning the fiber and placing it in contact with the device, or using a lens to allow coupling over an air gap. Typically, the size of the fiber mode is much larger than the size of the mode in a laser diode or a silicon optical chip. In this case, a tapered or lensed fiber is used to match the fiber mode field distribution to that of the other element. The lens on the end of the fiber can be formed using polishing, laser cutting or fusion splicing.

In a laboratory environment, a bare fiber end is coupled using a fiber launch system, which uses a microscope objective lens to focus the light down to a fine point. A precision translation stage (micro-positioning table) is used to move the lens, fiber, or device to allow the coupling efficiency to be optimized. Fibers with a connector on the end make this process much simpler: the connector is simply plugged into a pre-aligned fiber-optic collimator, which contains a lens that is either accurately positioned to the fiber or is adjustable. To achieve the best injection efficiency into a single-mode fiber, the direction, position, size, and divergence of the beam must all be optimized. With good optimization, 70 to 90% coupling efficiency can be achieved.

With properly polished single-mode fibers, the emitted beam has an almost perfect Gaussian shape—even in the far field—if a good lens is used. The lens needs to be large enough to support the full numerical aperture of the fiber, and must not introduce aberrations in the beam. Aspheric lenses are typically used.

=== Fiber fuse ===
At optical intensities above two megawatts per square centimeter, when a fiber is subjected to a shock or is otherwise suddenly damaged, a fiber fuse can occur. The reflection from the damage vaporizes the fiber immediately before the break, and this new defect remains reflective so that the damage propagates back toward the transmitter at 1–3 meters per second (4–11 km/h, 2–8 mph). The open fiber control system, which ensures laser eye safety in the event of a broken fiber, can also effectively halt propagation of the fiber fuse. In situations, such as undersea cables, where high power levels might be used without the need for open fiber control, a fiber fuse protection device at the transmitter can break the circuit to minimize damage.

=== Chromatic dispersion ===
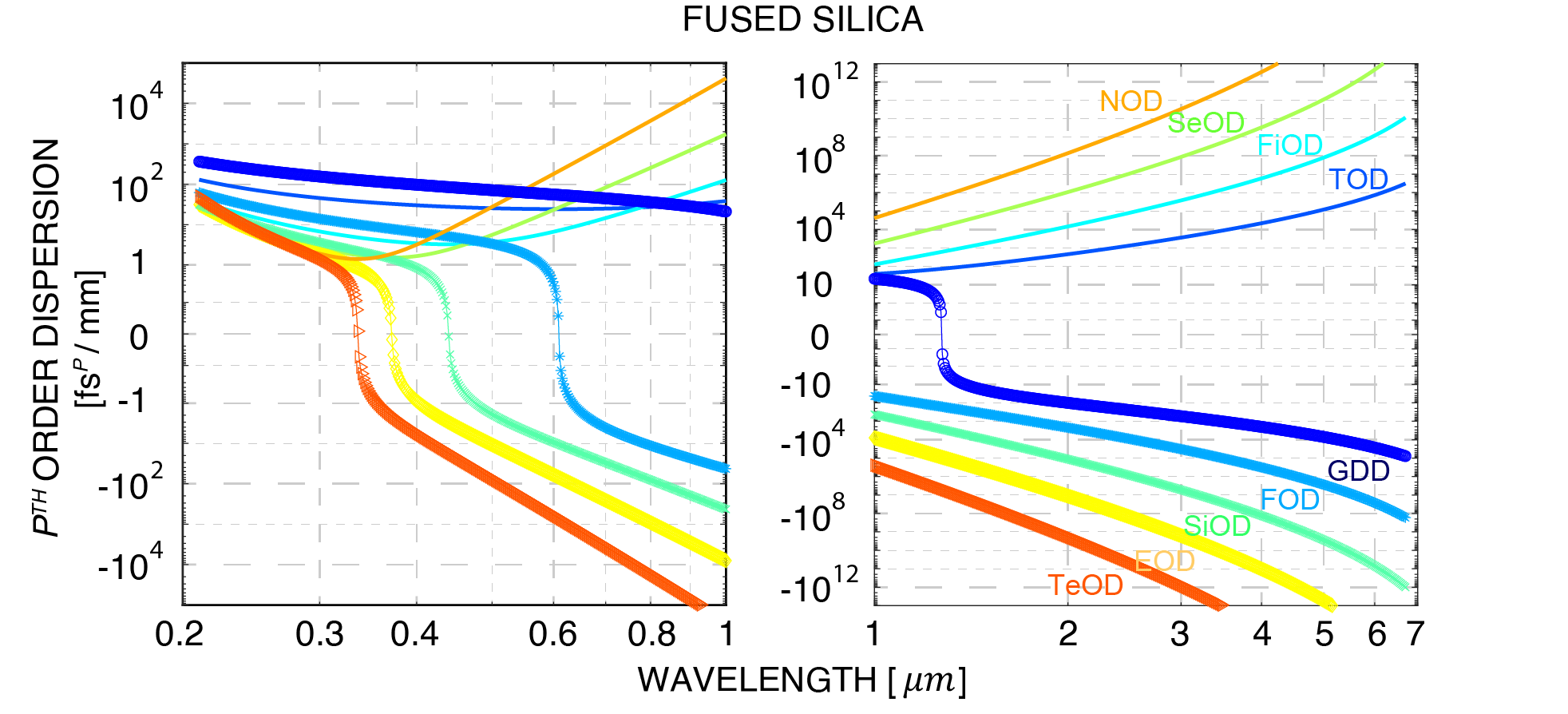
Dispersion orders of fused silica. GDD: Group delay dispersion, TOD: 3rd-order dispersion, FOD: 4th order, FiOD: 5th order, SiOD: 6th order, SeOD: 7th order, EOD:8th order, NOD: 9th order, TeOD: 10th order

The refractive index of fibers varies slightly with the frequency of light, and light sources are not perfectly monochromatic. Chromatic dispersion arises from both the waveguide structure of the fiber and the dispersive properties of the glass itself, with the latter contribution typically being dominant. Modulation of the light source to transmit a signal also slightly widens the frequency band of the transmitted light. This has the effect that, over long distances and at high modulation speeds, different portions of light can take different times to arrive at the receiver, ultimately making the signal impossible to discern. This problem can be overcome in several ways, including the use of extra repeaters and the use of a relatively short length of fiber that has the opposite refractive index gradient.

== See also ==
- Fiber Bragg grating
- Fiber management system
- The Fiber Optic Association
- Gradient-index optics
- Leaky mode
- Modal bandwidth
- Optical mesh network
- Optical power meter
- Passive optical network
- Return loss
- Subwavelength-diameter optical fiber
