= Modular function deployment =

Modular Function Deployment (MFD) is a method for creating modular product architectures, based on research performed at KTH Royal Institute of Technology in the 1990s. As a result of said research, the company Modular Management was registered in 1996, offering consultancy services centered on the MFD method.

With a modular product architecture, companies can offer a wide range of products and services without increasing complexity, since modules and module variants, like blocks of LEGO, can be configured in many different ways. The MFD method ensures that each module has functional, strategic and customer-centric value and can be combined with other modules through standardized interfaces. A modular product architecture can enable mass customization, where customers configure and order personalized—rather than ready-made—products and services.

== Five Steps ==
MFD consists of five steps and is often illustrated as a circle to emphasize that it is an iterative process.

1. Clarify customer needs
2. Identify functions and solutions
3. Propose modules and interfaces
4. Define variants and configurations
5. Confirm architecture feasibility
