= Core (optical fiber) =

Part of an optical fiber that carries light

The structure of a typical single-mode fiber: 1. Core 9 μm diameter; 2. Cladding 125 μm dia.; 3. Coating 250 μm dia.; 4. Buffer or jacket 900 μm dia.

Light propagating in a multi-mode fiber

The core of a conventional optical fiber is the part of the fiber that guides the light. It is a cylinder of glass or plastic that runs along the fiber's length. Generally, plastic fiber (POF) is used for very short-range and consumer applications, whereas glass fiber (GOF) is used for short/medium-range (multimode) and long-range (single-mode) telecommunications. The core is surrounded by a medium with a lower index of refraction, typically a cladding of a different glass, or plastic.

Light traveling in the core reflects from the core-cladding boundary due to total internal reflection, as long as the angle between the light and the boundary is greater than the critical angle. As a result, the fiber transmits all rays that enter the fiber with an angle to the fiber's axis smaller than the acceptance angle. Light rays confined by the core/cladding boundary are called guided rays.

The core is differentiated primarily by its diameter or cross-sectional area, each of which impacts various performance characteristics. The core's diameter should be uniform with a perfectly circular cross-section, but due to manufacturing tolerance and defects the diameter is more rigorously defined as the average of the diameters of the smallest circle that can be circumscribed about the core-cladding boundary, and the largest circle that can be inscribed within the core-cladding boundary; allowing for deviations from circularity.

Another commonly quoted statistic for core size is the mode field diameter. This is the diameter at which the intensity of light in the fiber falls to some specified fraction of maximum (usually 1/e^{2} ≈ 13.5%). For single-mode fiber, the mode field diameter is larger than the physical diameter of the core, because the light penetrates slightly into the cladding as an evanescent wave.

The three industry standard core sizes for fiber optic communication cables are:

- 9 μm diameter (single-mode)
- 50 μm diameter (multi-mode)
- 62.5 μm diameter (multi-mode)

== See also ==
- Buffer (optical fiber)
