= FC connector =

Fiber-optic connector

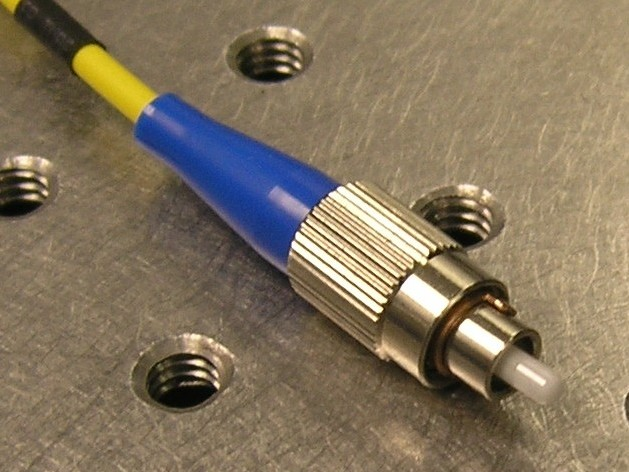
FC/PC connector

The FC connector is a fiber-optic connector with a threaded body, which was designed for use in high-vibration environments. It is commonly used with both single-mode optical fiber and polarization-maintaining optical fiber. FC connectors are used in datacom, telecommunications, measurement equipment, and single-mode lasers. They are becoming less common, displaced by SC and LC connectors. The FC connector has been standardized in TIA fiber optic connector intermateability standard EIA/TIA-604-4.

The FC connector was originally called a "Field Assembly Connector" by its inventors. The name "FC" is an acronym for "ferrule connector" or "fiber channel".

== Design ==
The fiber end is embedded in a 2.5 mm ferrule made of zirconia ceramic or stainless steel. The tip is then typically polished to produce a rounded surface, called "physical contact" polish. This surface profile means that when the fibers are mated they touch only at their cores, allowing transmission with low loss. The fibers are spring-loaded to control the force as the plug is screwed into the receptacle. A key prevents the fiber from rotating while the connectors are being mated.

=== Polish options ===
Some manufacturers have several grades of polish, for example an FC connector may be designated "FC/PC" (for Physical Contact), while "FC/SPC" and "FC/UPC" may denote "super" and "ultra" polish qualities, respectively. Higher grades of polish give less insertion loss and lower back-reflection.

For applications requiring very low back-reflection, the fiber end-face is polished at an angle (the typical industry standard being 8°) to prevent light that reflects from the interface from traveling back up the fiber. Because of the angle, the reflected light does not stay in the fiber core but instead leaks out into the cladding. Angle-polished connectors only mate properly to other angle-polished connectors. Mating to a non-angle polished connector causes very high insertion loss. Generally angle-polished connectors have higher insertion loss than good quality straight physical contact ones. "Ultra" quality connectors may achieve comparable back reflection to an angled connector when connected, but an angled connection maintains low back reflection even when the output end of the fiber is unmated.

Angle-polished connections are distinguished visibly by the use of a green strain relief boot. The connectors are typically designated "FC/APC" (for Angled Physical Contact), or merely "FCA".

== Analysis ==
FC connectors' floating ferrule provides good mechanical isolation. FC connectors need to be mated more carefully than push-pull type connectors due to the need to align the key, and due to the risk of scratching the fiber endface while inserting the ferrule into the jack. FC connectors have been replaced in many applications by SC and LC connectors.

There are four incompatible standards for key widths on FC connectors: one for FC/PC, two for FC/APC, and one that can be used for either.

FC Connector Key Widths
Connector type	Plug key width (mm)	Receptacle keyway width (mm)
FC/PC	≤ 2.14	≥ 2.15
FC/APC type N (wide key)	2.09–2.14	2.15–2.20
FC/APC type R (narrow key)	1.97–2.02	2.03–2.08
Either	2.13–2.15	2.16–2.18

The 2.14 mm FC/APC key format is typically called "wide key", "NTT" or "type N". The narrower 2 mm key format is called "Reduced" or "type R". Type R plugs will mate to any receptacle, but will fail to maintain precise rotation angle unless the receptacle is also type R. Type N plugs will not mate with type R receptacles but will mate with FC/PC receptacles. FC/PC plugs will mate with type N receptacles and may or may not mate with type R receptacles. Some manufacturers mark type R keys with a single scribe mark on the key, and type N keys with a double scribe mark.

Accurate rotation angle alignment is especially important for polarization-maintaining (PM) fiber, where rotational misalignment between mated fibers decreases the polarization extinction ratio of the connection. PM FC/PC connectors typically use FC/APC keying since the angular alignment tolerance is tighter.

Some connector designs have the key as a separate, indexable component. This can allow for some reduction in insertion losses (depending on the concentricity accuracy of the ferrule) by allowing the ferrule to be rotated to a more fortuitous alignment.

== See also ==
- Optical fiber cable Color coding of connector boot and fiber cable jackets
