= Fanout cable =

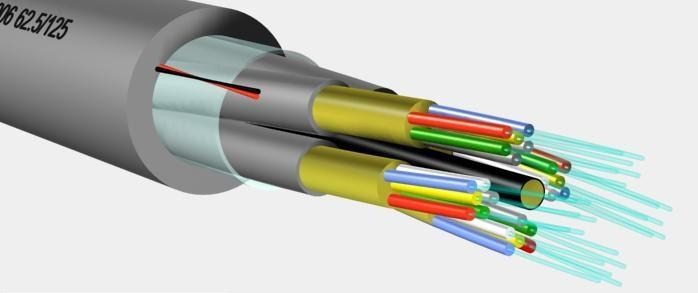
A breakout cable

Breakout-style fiberoptic cable (also called breakout cable or fanout cable), is an optical fiber cable containing several jacketed simplex optical fibers packaged together inside an outer jacket. This differs from distribution-style cable, in which tight-buffered fibers are bundled together, with only the outer cable jacket of the cable protecting them. The design of breakout-style cable adds strength for ruggedized drops, however the cable is larger and more expensive than distribution-style cable. Breakout cable is suitable for short riser and plenum applications and also for use in conduits, where a very simple cable run is planned to avoid the use of any splicebox or spliced fiber pigtails.

Because each fiber is individually reinforced, the cable can be easily divided into individual fiber lines. Each simplex cable within the outer jacket may be broken out and then continue as a patch cable, for example in a fiber to the desk application in an office building. This enables connector termination without requiring special junctions, and can reduce or eliminate the need for fiberoptic patch panels or an optical distribution frame. Breakout cable requires terminations to be done with simple connectors, which may be preferred for some situations. A more common solution today is the use of a fanout kit that adds a jacket to the very fine strands of other cable types.

== Ribbon fanout pigtails ==
Ribbon fanout pigtails are made of ribbon fiber optic cables. It is generally installed in closet area or horizontal patch extension from consolidation point to the workstation outlets.

It includes: jacket ribbon fanout pigtails and bare ribbon fanout pigtails. Jacket ribbon fanout pigtails have outer jacket. Bare ribbon fanout pigtails have no outer jacket and generally protected by transparent tube.

== Bunch fanout pigtails ==
Bunch fanout pigtails are made of multi-core round bunch fiber optic cable, which is also called distribution fiber optic cable. It is generally installed in closet area like rack mount or wall mount splice boxes or patch panels.

== See also ==
- Breakout box (copper equivalent)

Template:Telecomm-infrastructure-stub
