= Fiber cable termination =

Addition of connectors to each optical fiber in a cable

Fiber-optic cable termination is the addition of connectors to each optical fiber in a cable. The fibers need to have connectors fitted before they can attach to other equipment. Two common solutions for fiber cable termination are pigtails and fanout kits or breakout kits.

== Process ==
In order to terminate a fiber-optic cable, the appropriate connector must be determined. The type of fiber-optic adapter that the terminated cable will connect to will dictate which connector will be used. The most common types that are added to fiber-optic cable in inside plant environments are LC, SC, ST, and FC. Some fiber connectors are pre-polished mechanical connectors for ease of installation or anaerobic connectors which require cleaving and polishing.

Once the appropriate connector has been identified, the termination process can begin. Common termination methods include no-epoxy-no-polish, epoxy and polish and pigtail splicing. Regardless of the method, the beginning steps are the same. First, the sleeve, or secondary coating, must be stripped from the fiber. The primary coating must also be stripped away, revealing the bare fiber. Best practice guidelines from the FOA mandate that the bare fiber be cleaned by an alcohol wipe at this step. The face, or cross section must be cleaved first before the bare fiber is ready to be joined with a connector. Once the fiber is stripped, cleaned, and cleaved, it is ready to be joined to a connector.

== Pigtails ==
A fiber pigtail is a single, short, usually tight-buffered, optical fiber that has an optical connector pre-installed on one end and a length of exposed fiber at the other end.

The end of the pigtail is stripped and fusion spliced to a single fiber of a multi-fiber trunk. Splicing of pigtails to each fiber in the trunk "breaks out" the multi-fiber cable into its component fibers for connection to the end equipment.

Pigtails can have female or male connectors. Female connectors could be mounted in a patch panel, often in pairs although single-fiber solutions exist, to allow them to be connected to endpoints or other fiber runs with patch fibers. Alternatively they can have male connectors and plug directly into an optical transceiver.

Fiber-optic pigtails are available for both singlemode and multimode fiber, and are available with several common types of connector: LC, SC, ST, etc. Multi-fiber pigtails with up to 12 fibers are also available.

== Fanout kit (breakout kit) ==
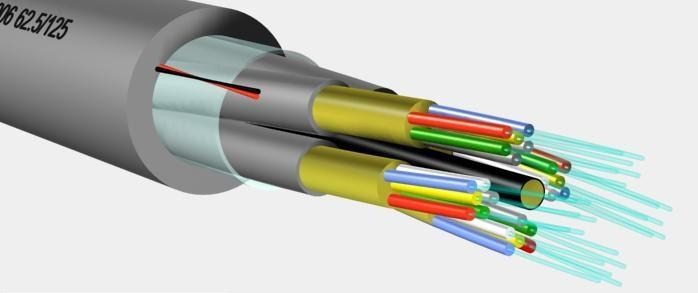
A breakout cable

A fanout kit is a set of empty jackets designed to protect fragile tight-buffered strands of fiber from a cable. This allows the individual fibers to be terminated without splicing, and without needing a protective enclosure such as a splicebox. This is normally an option with fiber distribution cable, or sometimes loose-buffer or ribbon cable, because these types of cable contain multiple strands that are designed for a permanent termination. The ribbon fanout pigtails include: Ribbon cable, Fanout kit, Fanout tubing and Connectors.

Zip-cord style jackets, including those that contain Aramid yarn as the strength member, can be slipped over multiple fiber strands coming out of a loose buffer cable to convert it to a complete set of single-fiber cables that can be directly attached to optical connectors. A plastic boot is normally used for strain relief and protection from moisture. Use of a breakout kit enables a fiber-optic cable containing multiple loose buffer tubes to receive connectors without the splicing of pigtails.

== See also ==
- Breakout cable
