= Network filter =

Network filter may refer to:

- Firewall (computing), especially a packet filter, to control inbound and outbound network traffic at the device or local-area-network level
- A computer and network surveillance device or software, of a variety of types
- An Internet filter, software (or firmware) that performs content control and blockage
- A filter (signal processing) of any of several types, as used on a network line or to adjust a wireless network signal, to improve signal quality by removing "noise" (interference)
  - A line conditioner of any of several types, as used on a network line, especially:
    - Attenuator (electronics), an electronic device that reduces the amplitude of an electronic signal, as used on an Ethernet or other electrical network line
    - Optical attenuator, an electronic device that reduces the amplitude of an optical signal, as used on a fiberoptic network line
