= Gap loss =

Gap loss in action

Gap loss is a type of signal strength loss that occurs in fiber optic transmission when the signal is transferred from one section of fiber or cable to another.

The three basic types of gap loss are angular misalignment loss, lateral offset loss, and longitudinal displacement loss. The losses tend to be proportional to the ratio of the core radius to the size of the gap or displacement. Formulas, examples and graphs can be found at Fiber Optic Communication - Couplers and Connectors Gap loss can be reduced by filling the gap with a gel that matches the index of refraction of the fiber as closely as possible.

== Definition ==
Specifically, gap loss happens when the signal from one end of a piece of cable is transferred to another, but there is a space, breakage, or gap between them. Since fiber optics transmit data via light the light can cross this gap, but spreads out and is weakened and diffused when it does so.

The light that crosses the gap and enters the next section of cable is broken up. Some of it reflects off, and some will hit the covering of the cable and not enter into the cable. If the gap is small, the gap loss will be small, but if the gap is very large, it may totally corrupt the signal.

Gap loss can be caused by many factors, but the most common is poorly fitted multi-sectional fiber optic cables. If there is a break in a directly buried fiber optic line then usually there will simply be a loss of signal.

== Effects of gap loss ==
As a result of signal strength and cohesion being lost (due to the scattering of the light), a fiber optic signal suffering from gap loss is degraded in both quality and throughput.

== See also ==
- Optical fiber cable Color coding of connector boot and fiber cable jackets
- Optical attenuator Fiber optic attenuator
- Optical fiber connector
