= Fiber-optic cable =

Cable assembly containing one or more optical fibers that are used to carry light

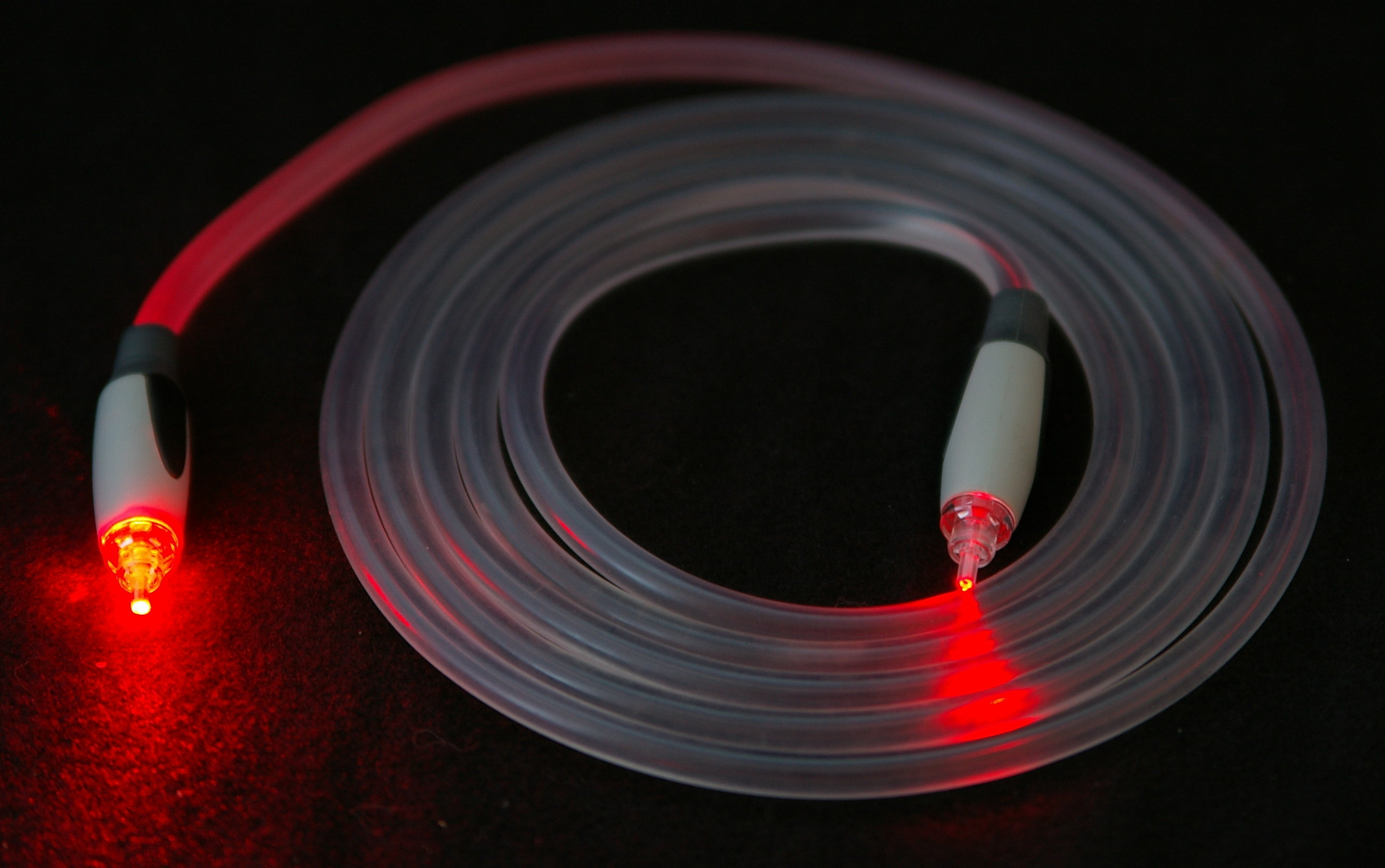
A TOSLINK optical fiber cable with a clear jacket. These cables are used mainly for digital audio connections between devices.

A fiber-optic cable, also known as an optical-fiber cable, is an assembly that contains one or more optical fibers, glass or polymer, that carry light, with construction similar to an electrical cable. Individual optical fibers are typically coated with various polymer layers and ultimately enclosed by an outer jacket. The jacketed cable can be routed with no protection or contained in an electrical conduit suitable for the environment where the cable is used. Different fiber-optic cable types: SMF or MMF, are used for fiber-optic communication in diverse applications: long-distances, connecting parts of a building, or transmitting data across continents.

== Design ==
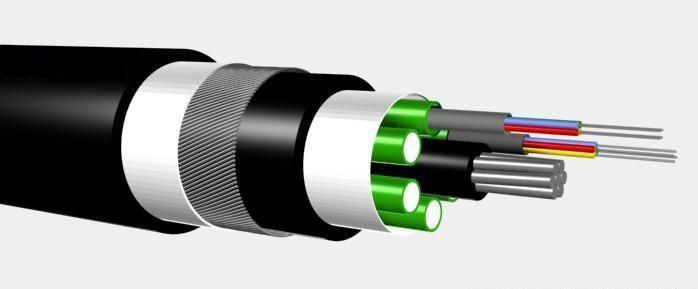
A multi-fiber cable

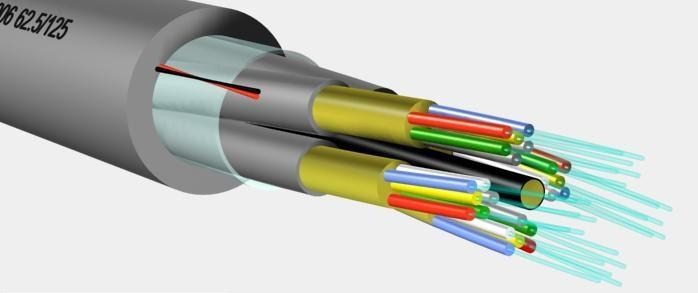
An optical fiber breakout cable

Fiber-optic ribbon cable
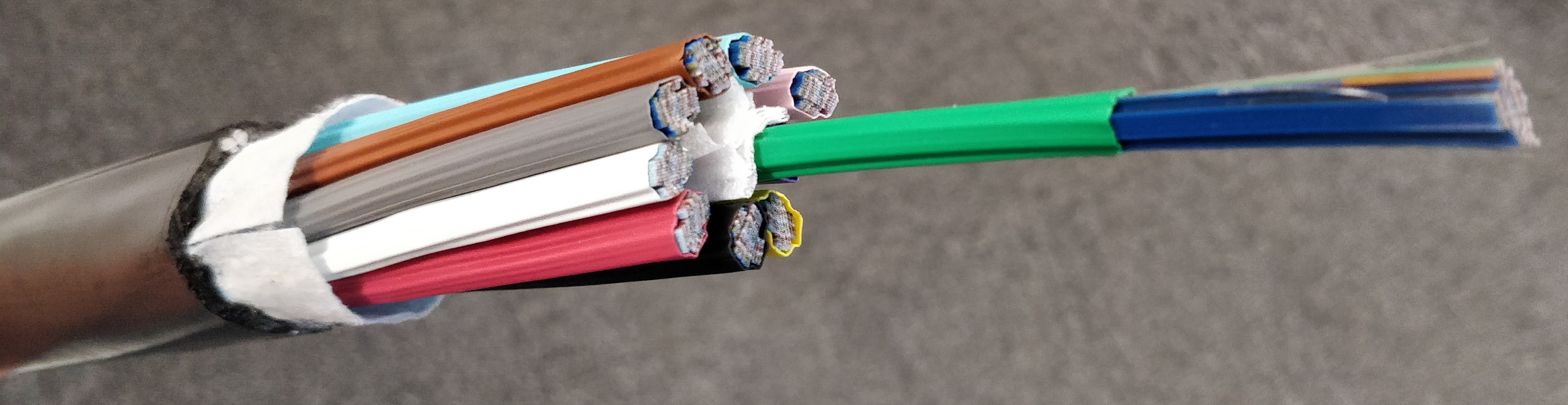

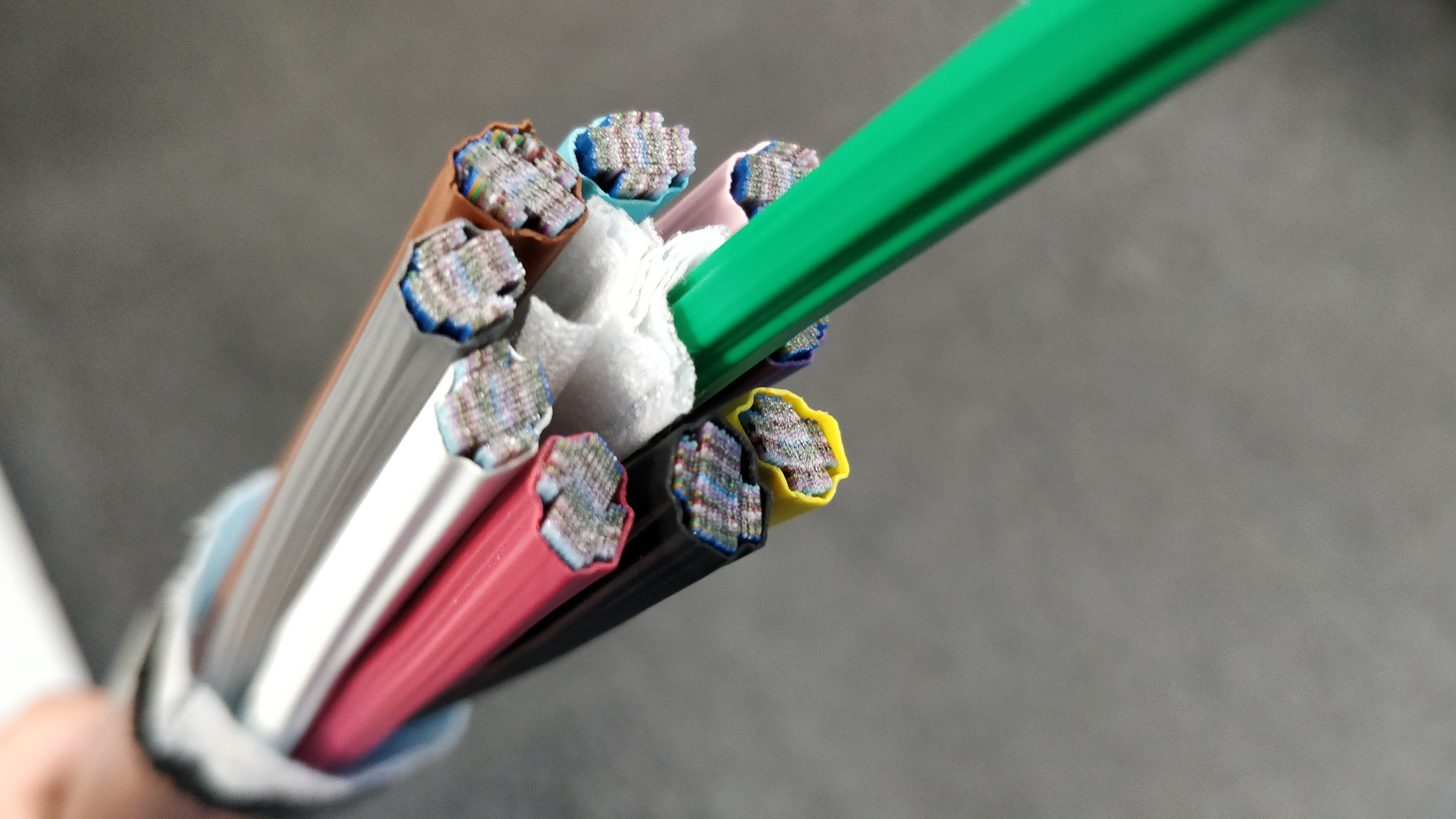
Ribbon-type fiber-optic cables can house many more fibers than loose-tube types.

=== Core and cladding ===
Optical fiber consists of a core and a cladding layer. The materials are selected such that total internal reflection due to the difference in the refractive index between the two will guide the light and keep it mostly within the core.

==== Fiber material ====
There are two main types of material used for optical fibers: glass and plastic, offering widely different characteristics and use applications. Generally, plastic fiber (POF) is used for very short-range and consumer applications, whereas glass fiber (GOF) is used for short/medium-range (multimode) and long-range (single-mode) telecommunications.

==== Hollow-core fiber ====
In hollow-core optical fibers, light travels through air rather than solid glass. In 2025, a double-nested antiresonant nodeless fiber (DNANF) achieved a record transmission loss of 0.091 dB/km at 1,550 nm, lower than the best solid-core silica fibers (≈0.14 dB/km). Field trials in China demonstrated an 800 Gbit/s hollow-core link over 20 km with fusion losses as low as 0.05 dB and average cable loss of 0.6 dB/km. Hollow-core fibers reduce latency because light propagates faster in air than in glass, and they also suppress nonlinear effects and dispersion.

=== Coating ===
The cladding is usually coated with a layer of acrylate polymer or polyimide. This coating protects the fiber from damage but does not contribute to its optical waveguide properties.

=== Assembly jacket ===
To make a cable, individual coated fibers (or fibers formed into ribbons or bundles) have a tough resin buffer layer or core tube(s) extruded around them. Some common jacket materials are LSZH, polyvinyl chloride, polyethylene, polyurethane, polybutylene terephthalate, and polyamide. The jacket material selection is application-specific and determines the mechanical robustness, chemical and UV radiation resistance, etc.

Several layers of protective sheathing, depending on the application, are added to form the cable assembly. Rigid fiber assemblies sometimes put light-absorbing ("dark") glass between the fibers to prevent light that leaks out of one fiber from entering another to reduce crosstalk between the fibers, or reduces flare in fiber bundle imaging applications.

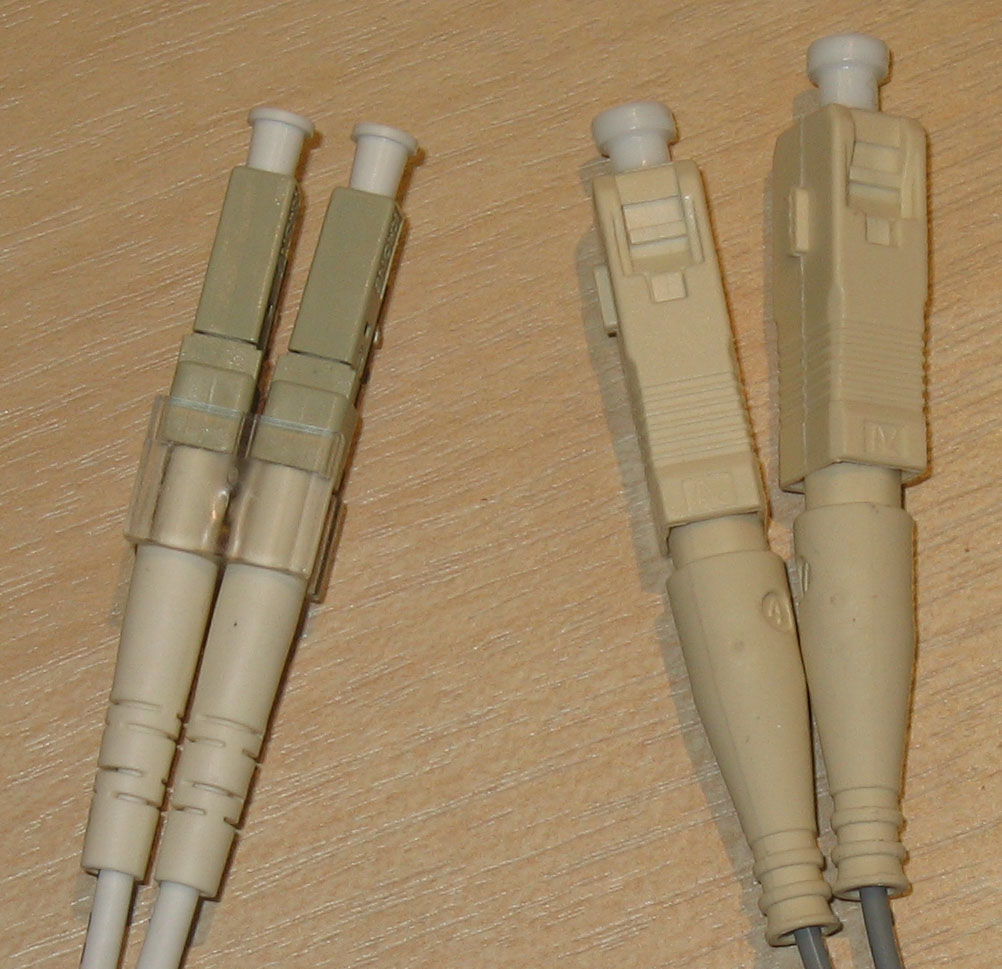
Left: LC/PC connectors Right: SC/PC connectors All four connectors have white caps covering the ferrules.

For indoor applications, the jacketed fiber is generally enclosed, together with a bundle of flexible fibrous polymer strength members like aramid (e.g., Twaron or Kevlar), in a lightweight plastic cover to form a simple cable. Each end of the cable may be terminated with a specialized optical fiber connector to allow it to be easily connected and disconnected from transmitting and receiving equipment.

For use in more strenuous environments, a much more robust cable construction is required. In loose-tube construction the fiber is laid helically into semi-rigid tubes, allowing the cable to stretch without stretching the fiber itself. This protects the fiber from tension during laying and due to temperature changes. Loose-tube fiber may be dry block or gel-filled. Dry block offers less protection to the fibers than gel-filled, but costs considerably less.

Instead of a loose tube, the fiber may be embedded in a heavy polymer jacket, commonly called tight buffer construction. Tight buffer cables are offered for a variety of applications, but the two most common are breakout and distribution. Breakout cables normally contain a ripcord, two non-conductive dielectric strengthening members (normally a glass rod epoxy), an aramid yarn, and 3 mm buffer tubing with an additional layer of Kevlar surrounding each fiber. The ripcord is a parallel cord of strong yarn that is situated under the jacket(s) of the cable for jacket removal. Distribution cables have an overall Kevlar wrapping, a ripcord, and a 900 micrometer buffer coating surrounding each fiber. These fiber units are commonly bundled with additional steel strength members, again with a helical twist to allow for stretching.

Domestic outdoor FTTP cable
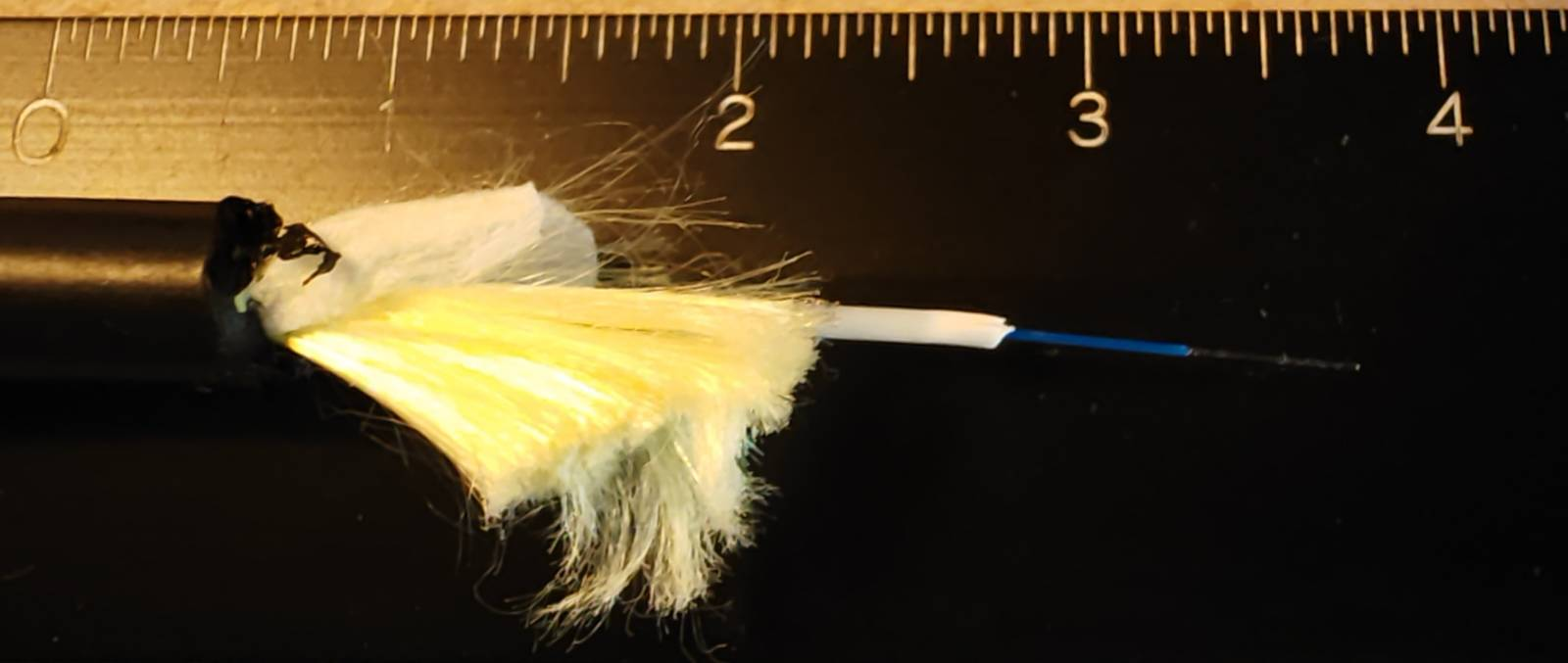

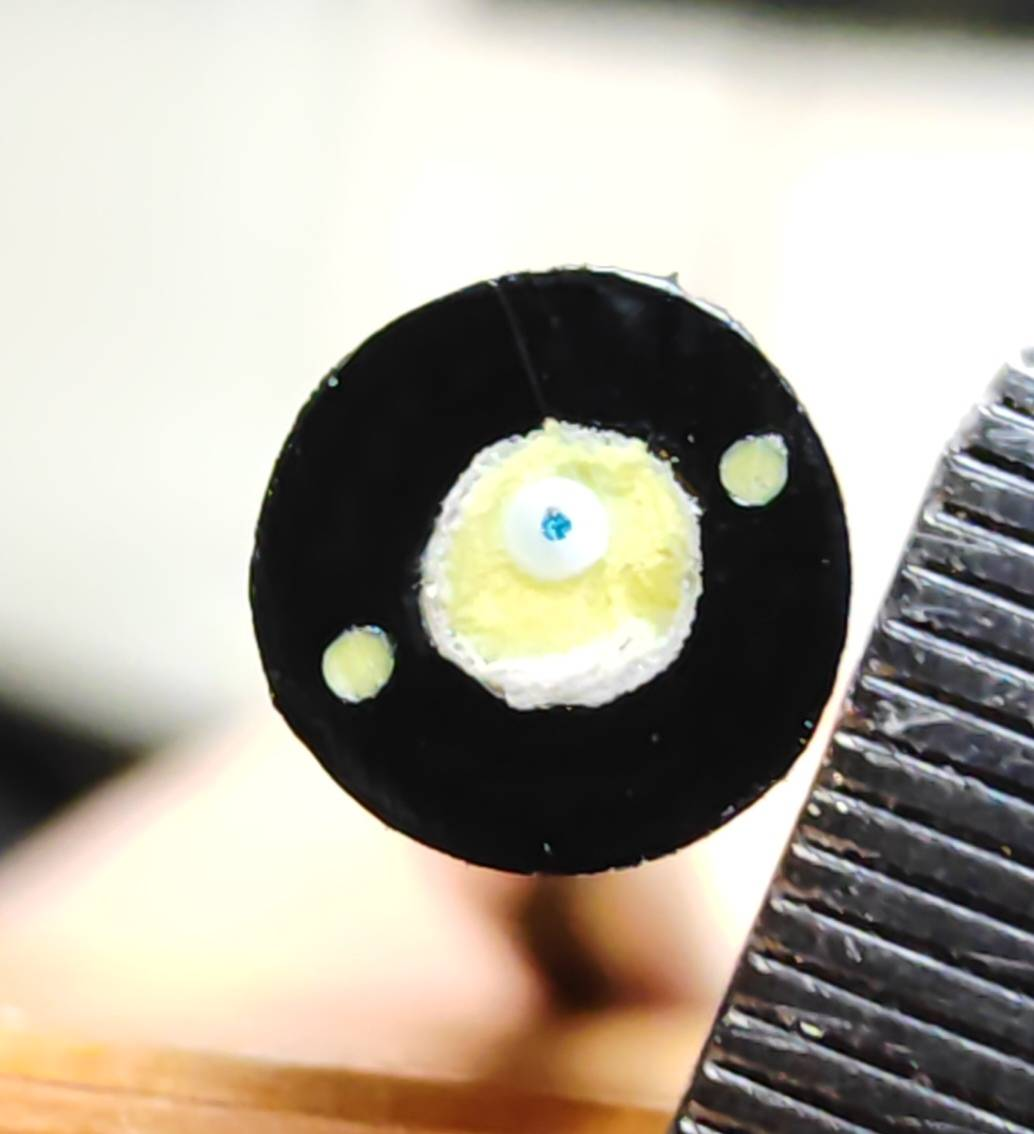
Approximate diameters: Outer sheath: 5 mm, outer white paper wrapper: ⌀2.5 mm, inner white plastic sheath: ⌀890 μm, blue sheath: ⌀250 μm, optical fiber: ⌀150 μm

A critical concern in outdoor cabling is to protect the fiber from damage by water. This can be accomplished by use of solid barriers such as copper tubes and water-repellent jelly or water-absorbing powder surrounding the fiber.

==== Armor ====
The cable may be further armored to protect it from environmental hazards, such as construction equipment, gnawing animals, fishing gear, or anchors. Fiber optic cables are available in a wide variety of sheathings and armor, designed for applications such as direct burial in trenches, dual use as power lines, installation in conduit, lashing to aerial telephone poles, submarine installation, and insertion in utility cuts of paved streets.

Undersea cables are more heavily armored in their near-shore portions to protect them from boat anchors, fishing gear, and even sharks, which may be attracted to the electrical power that is carried to power amplifiers or repeaters in the cable.

== Performance ==
=== Capacity ===
In September 2012, NTT Japan demonstrated a single fiber cable that was able to transfer 1 petabit per second (10^{15}bits/s) over a distance of 50 kilometers.

Although larger cables are available, the highest strand-count single-mode fiber cable commonly manufactured is the 864-count, consisting of 36 ribbons each containing 24 strands of fiber. These high fiber count cables are used in data centers, and as distribution cables in HFC and PON networks.

In some cases, only a small fraction of the fibers in a cable may actually be in use. Companies can lease or sell the unused fiber to other providers who are looking for service in or through an area. Depending on specific local regulations, companies may overbuild their networks for the specific purpose of having a large network of dark fiber for sale, reducing the overall need for trenching and municipal permitting. Alternatively, they may deliberately under-invest to prevent their rivals from profiting from their investment.

=== Reliability and quality ===
Optical fibers are very strong, but the strength is drastically reduced by unavoidable microscopic surface flaws inherent in the manufacturing process. The initial fiber strength, as well as its change with time, must be considered relative to the stress imposed on the fiber during handling, cabling, and installation for a given set of environmental conditions. There are three basic scenarios that can lead to strength degradation and failure by inducing flaw growth: dynamic fatigue, static fatigue, and zero-stress aging.

Telcordia GR-20, Generic Requirements for Optical Fiber and Optical Fiber Cable, contains reliability and quality criteria to protect optical fiber in all operating conditions. The criteria concentrate on conditions in an outside plant (OSP) environment. For the indoor plant, similar criteria are in Telcordia GR-409, Generic Requirements for Indoor Fiber Optic Cable.

=== Propagation speed and delay ===
Optical cables transfer data at the speed of light in glass. This is the speed of light in vacuum divided by the refractive index of the glass used, typically around 180,000 to 200,000 km/s, resulting in 5.0 to 5.5 microseconds of latency per km. Thus, the round-trip delay time for 1000 km is around 11 milliseconds.

=== Losses ===
Signal loss in optical fiber is measured in decibels (dB). A loss of 3 dB across a link means the light at the far end is only half the intensity of the light that was sent into the fiber. A 6 dB loss means only one quarter of the light made it through the fiber. Once too much light has been lost, the signal is too weak to recover and the link becomes unreliable and eventually ceases to function entirely. The exact point at which this happens depends on the transmitter power and the sensitivity of the receiver.

Typical modern multimode graded-index fibers have 3 dB per kilometre of attenuation (signal loss) at a wavelength of 850 nm, and 1 dB/km at 1300 nm. Single-mode loses 0.35 dB/km at 1310 nm and 0.25 dB/km at 1550 nm. Very high quality single-mode fiber intended for long-distance applications is specified at a loss of 0.19 dB/km at 1550 nm. Plastic optical fiber (POF) loses much more: 1 dB/m at 650 nm. POF is large core (about 1 mm) fiber suitable only for short, low-speed networks such as TOSLINK optical audio or for use within cars.

Each connection between cables adds about 0.6 dB of average loss, and each joint (splice) adds about 0.1 dB. Many fiber optic cable connections have a loss budget, which is the maximum amount of loss that is allowed.

Invisible infrared light (750 nm and larger) is used in commercial glass fiber communications because it has lower attenuation in such materials than visible light. However, the glass fibers will transmit visible light somewhat, which is convenient for simple testing of the fibers without requiring expensive equipment. Splices can be inspected visually and adjusted for minimal light leakage at the joint, which maximizes light transmission between the ends of the fibers being joined.

The charts Understanding wavelengths in fiber optics and Optical power loss (attenuation) in fiber illustrate the relationship of visible light to the infrared frequencies used, and show the absorption water bands between 850, 1300 and 1550 nm.

=== Environmental considerations ===
Fiber-optic cabling is significantly more efficient than copper which means that less energy is consumed compared to traditional copper cable infrastructures. This contributes to greater environmental sustainability both for the transmission itself and also by reducing cooling demands in data centers and network hubs.

=== Safety ===
The infrared light used in telecommunications cannot be seen, so there is a potential laser safety hazard to technicians. The eye's natural defense against sudden exposure to bright light is the blink reflex, which is not triggered by infrared sources. In some cases the power levels are high enough to damage eyes, particularly when lenses or microscopes are used to inspect fibers that are emitting invisible infrared light. Inspection microscopes with optical safety filters are available to guard against this. More recently, indirect viewing aids are used, which can comprise a camera mounted within a handheld device, which has an opening for the connectorized fiber and a USB output for connection to a display device such as a laptop. This makes the activity of looking for damage or dirt on the connector face much safer.

Small glass fragments can also be a problem if they get under someone's skin, so care is needed to ensure that fragments produced when cleaving fiber are properly collected and disposed of appropriately.

== Cable types ==
This list includes both standards-based and real-world technical cable types utilized in fiber-optic infrastructure, telecoms, enterprise, and outdoor applications.

- OFC: Optical fiber, conductive
- OFN: Optical fiber, non-conductive
- OFCG: Optical fiber, conductive, general use
- OFNG: Optical fiber, non-conductive, general use
- OFCP: Optical fiber, conductive, plenum
- OFNP: Optical fiber, non-conductive, plenum
- OFCR: Optical fiber, conductive, riser
- OFNR: Optical fiber, non-conductive, riser
- OPAC: Optical attached cable
- OPGW: Optical fiber composite overhead ground wire
- ADSS: All-dielectric self-supporting
- OSP: Fiber-optic cable, outside plant
- MDU: Fiber-optic cable, multiple dwelling unit
- OM1: Multimode optical fiber with a 62.5 μm core, now considered outdated was commonly used for short-distance transmission before the 2000s
- OM2: Multimode optical fiber with a 50 μm core, used for moderate distances
- OM3: Laser-optimized multimode fiber, 50 μm core, high bandwidth
- OM4: Enhanced laser-optimized multimode fiber
- OM5: Wide-band multimode fiber, 50 μm core, designed for optimized wavelength multiplexing and high bandwidth
- OS1: Single-mode fiber, up to 10 km transmission distance
- OS2: Single-mode fiber, optimized for long-distance/high-speed backbone links, up to 200 km
- Armored fiber cable: fiber-optic cable with an additional protective metal layer
- Hybrid optical/electrical cable: Cables combining optical fibers and electrical conductors under one jacket
- Ribbon fiber cable: Cable containing fiber strands arranged in flat ribbon units
- Breakout cable: A cable design featuring individual fiber strands, each within its own jacket for direct patching or fan outs

== Color coding ==
=== Patch cords ===
The buffer or jacket on patch cords is often color-coded to indicate the type of fiber used. The strain relief boot protecting the fiber from bending at a connector can be color-coded to indicate the type of connection. Connectors with a plastic shell (such as SC connectors) typically use a color-coded shell. Standard color codings for jackets (or buffers) and boots (or connector shells) are shown below:

Cord jacket (or buffer) color
Color	Meaning
Orange	Multimode optical fiber
Aqua	OM3 or OM4 10 G laser-optimized 50/125 μm multimode optical fiber
Erika violet	OM4 multimode optical fiber (some vendors)
Lime green	OM5 10 G + wideband 50/125 μm multimode optical fiber
Grey	Outdated color code for multimode optical fiber
Yellow	Single-mode optical fiber
Blue	Sometimes used to designate polarization-maintaining optical fiber

Connector boot (or shell) colors
Color	Meaning	Comment
Blue	Physical contact (PC), 0°	Mostly used for single mode fibers; some manufacturers use this for polarization-maintaining optical fiber.
Green	Angle polished (APC), 8°	
Black	Physical contact (PC), 0°	
Grey	Physical contact (PC), 0°	Multimode fiber connectors
Beige	Physical contact (PC), 0°	Multimode fiber connectors
White	Physical contact (PC), 0°	
Red		High optical power. Sometimes used to connect external pump lasers or Raman pumps.

Remark: It is also possible that a small part of a connector is additionally color-coded, e.g., the lever of an E-2000 connector or a frame of a fiber-optic adapter. This additional color coding indicates the correct port for a patch cord if many patch cords are installed at one point.

=== Multi-fiber cables ===
Individual fibers in a multi-fiber cable are often distinguished from one another by color-coded jackets or buffers on each fiber. The identification scheme used by Corning Cable Systems is based on EIA/TIA-598, "Optical Fiber Cable Color Coding", which defines identification schemes for fibers, buffered fibers, fiber units, and groups of fiber units within outside plant and premises optical fiber cables. This standard allows for fiber units to be identified by means of a printed legend. This method can be used for identification of fiber ribbons and fiber subunits. The legend will contain a corresponding printed numerical position number or color for use in identification.

EIA598-A fiber color chart
Position	Jacket color	Position	Jacket color
1	blue	13	blue/black
2	orange	14	orange/black
3	green	15	green/black
4	brown	16	brown/black
5	slate	17	slate/black
6	white	18	white/black
7	red	19	red/black
8	black	20	black/yellow
9	yellow	21	yellow/black
10	violet	22	violet/black
11	rose	23	rose/black
12	aqua	24	aqua/black

Color coding of premises fiber cable
Fiber type and class	Diameter (μm)	Jacket color
Multimode Ia	50/125	Orange
Multimode Ia	62.5/125	Slate
Multimode Ia	85/125	Blue
Multimode Ia	100/140	Green
Single-mode IVa	All	Yellow
Single-mode IVb	All	Red

The color code used above resembles PE copper cables used in standard telephone wiring.

In the UK a different color code is followed. Each 12-fiber bundle or element within a Cable Optical Fibre 200/201 cable is colored as follows:

COF200/201 fiber color chart
Position	Jacket color	Position	Jacket color
1	blue	7	brown
2	orange	8	violet
3	green	9	black
4	red	10	white
5	grey	11	pink
6	yellow	12	turquoise

Each element is in a tube within the cable (not a blown fiber tube). The cable elements start with the red tube and are counted around the cable to the green tube. Active elements are in white tubes and yellow fillers or dummies are laid in the cable to fill it out, depending on how many fibers and units exist – can be up to 276 fibers or 23 elements for external cable and 144 fibers or 12 elements for internal. The cable has a central strength member, normally made from fiberglass or plastic. There is also a copper conductor in external cables.

== Hybrid cables ==
There are hybrid optical and electrical cables that are used in wireless outdoor Fiber To The Antenna (FTTA) applications. In these cables, the optical fibers carry information, and the electrical conductors are used to transmit power. These cables can be placed in several environments to serve antennas mounted on poles, towers, and other structures.

According to Telcordia GR-3173, Generic Requirements for Hybrid Optical and Electrical Cables for Use in Wireless Outdoor Fiber To The Antenna (FTTA) Applications, these hybrid cables have optical fibers, twisted pair/quad elements, coaxial cables or current-carrying electrical conductors under a common outer jacket. The power conductors used in these hybrid cables are for directly powering an antenna or for powering tower-mounted electronics exclusively serving an antenna. They have a nominal voltage normally less than 60 VDC or 108/120 VAC. Other voltages may be present depending on the application and the relevant National Electrical Code (NEC).

These types of hybrid cables may also be useful in other environments, such as Distributed Antenna System (DAS) plants, where they will serve antennas in indoor, outdoor, and rooftop locations. Considerations such as fire resistance, Nationally Recognized Testing Laboratory (NRTL) Listings, placement in vertical shafts, and other performance-related issues need to be fully addressed for these environments.

Since the voltage levels and power levels used within these hybrid cables vary, electrical safety codes consider the hybrid cable to be a power cable, which needs to comply with rules on clearance, separation, etc.

== Innerducts ==
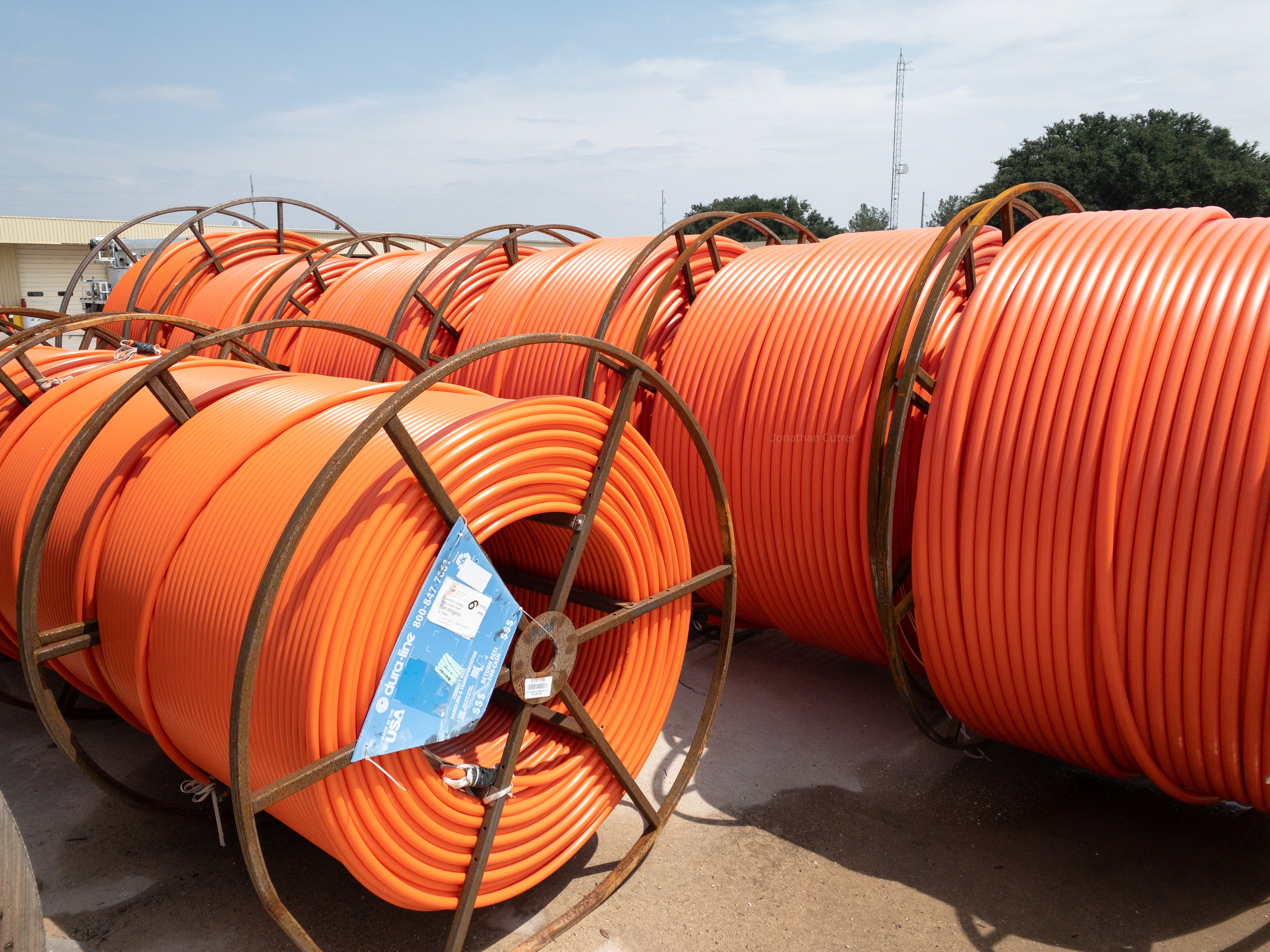
Underground HDPE innerduct conduit

Innerducts provide a means for subdividing conduit that was originally designed for single, large-diameter, high pulling tension metallic conductor electrical cable into multiple channels for optical cables having relatively low pulling tension limits (600-2700 N).

=== Types ===
Innerducts are typically small-diameter, semi-flexible subducts. According to Telcordia GR-356, there are three basic types of innerduct: smoothwall, corrugated, and ribbed, based on the profile of the inside and outside diameter. The need for a specific characteristic or combination of characteristics, such as pulling strength, flexibility, or the lowest coefficient of friction, dictates the type of innerduct required.

=== Mulitiduct ===
Beyond the basic profiles (smoothwall, corrugated, or ribbed), innerduct is also available in an increasing variety of multiduct designs. Multiduct may be either a composite unit consisting of up to four or six individual innerducts held together by mechanical means, or a single extruded product having multiple channels through which to pull several cables. In either case, multiduct can be coiled and pulled into existing conduit in a manner similar to that of conventional innerduct.

=== Placement ===
Innerducts are primarily installed in underground conduit systems that provide connecting paths between manhole locations. In addition to placement in conduit, innerduct can be directly buried or aerially installed by lashing the innerduct to a steel suspension strand.

As stated in GR-356, cable is typically placed into innerduct in one of three ways. It may be

1. Pre-installed by the innerduct manufacturer during the extrusion process,
2. Pulled into the innerduct using a mechanically assisted pull line, or
3. Blown into the innerduct using a high air volume cable blowing apparatus.

== See also ==
- ANSI/TIA-568, color coding for electrical cable
- Free-space optical communication
- Fusion splicing
- ISO/IEC 11801, structured cabling standard
- Optical power meter
- Optical time-domain reflectometer
- Parallel optical interface
- Power-over-fiber
- Tactical fiber-optic cable assembly
