= Video-in video-out =

Bidirectional graphics port standard

Video In Video Out (VIVO)
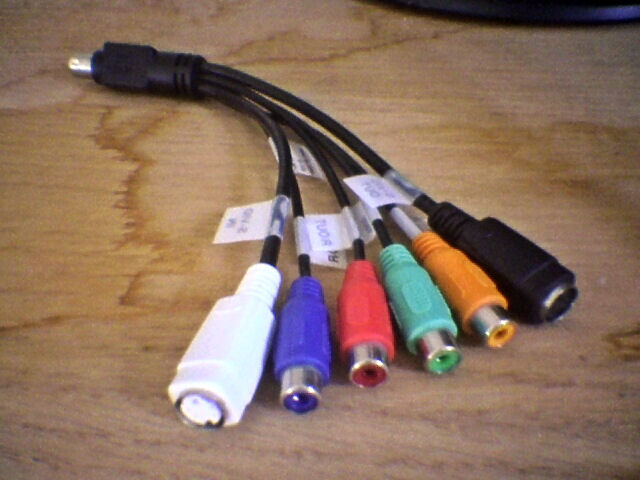
- A 6-connector VIVO splitter cable. From left to right: S-Video In, Component P_{b} out, Component P_{r} out, Component Y out/Composite out, Composite in, S-Video Out
- Type: Analog video connector

Production history
- Manufacturer: Various graphics card manufacturers

General specifications
- Width: 10
- Hot pluggable: Yes
- External: Yes
- Video signal: At least up to 1080p
- Pins: 9
- Connector: Mini-DIN 9

Pinout
- VIVO port using standard (left) and non-standard (right) Mini-DIN

Video in video out (usually seen as the acronym VIVO), commonly pronounced (/ˈvi.voʊ/ VEE-voh), is a graphics port which enables some video cards to have bidirectional (input and output) analog video transfer through a mini-DIN connector, usually of the 9-pin variety, and a specialised splitter cable (which can sometimes also transfer analog audio).

VIVO was found on high-end ATI and NVIDIA computer video cards, sometimes labeled "TV OUT". VIVO on these graphics cards typically supports composite, component, and S-Video as outputs, and composite and S-Video as inputs. Many other video cards only support component and/or S-Video outputs to complement VGA or DVI, typically using a component breakout cable and an S-Video cable. While component-out operation supports high-definition resolutions, it does not support the HDCP standard which would be required for official HDTV support as set out by the EICTA.

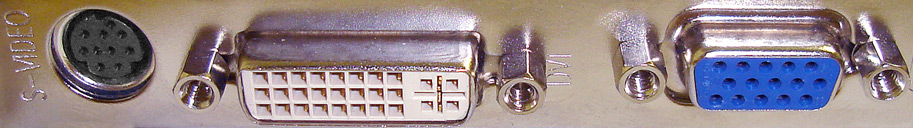
A graphics card with VIVO (left), DVI (center) and VGA (right) connections

Some practical uses of VIVO include being able to display multimedia stored on a computer on a TV, and being able to connect a DVD player or video game console to a computer while continuing to allow viewing via a TV monitor. VIVO itself, however, can not decode broadcast signals from any source, and so, like HDTV sets without tuners and composite monitors, additional equipment is required to be able to show broadcast TV programs.

Some manufacturers enable their version of the VIVO port to also transfer sound.

== Limitations ==
The VIVO output on graphics cards is often not used by those who have no need to connect their computer to a TV. Also, there can be issues in software supporting the use of VIVO ports.

A computer using VIVO must have software that can handle an input signal. For example, in the case of Nvidia GeForce series 6 and 7 video card users this means downloading Nvidia's WDM drivers.

Additionally, on Windows XP computers that use GeForce video cards with Scalable Link Interface (SLI) mode enabled, using a TV to display part of the desktop via VIVO is disabled, just as dual-monitor mode is disabled. Confusingly, however, some distorted images may be visible on a properly-connected VIVO-driven television display at boot-up due to the fact that prior to the OS loading the display driver, the video BIOS might initialize outputs that are then unavailable once the OS takes over and the driver loads into SLI mode.

== See also ==
- DIN connector
- Mini-DIN connector
- Composite video
- Component video
- YPbPr
- S-Video
- Display controller
