= Tactical fiber-optic cable assembly =

Fibre-optic cable designed for durability

A tactical fiber-optic cable assembly (TFOCA) is a fiber-optic cable that is designed for high strength, and to be used in harsh environments. TFOCAs are used in aerospace, oil-drilling, military, and water purification applications.

TFOCA connectors are generally hermaphroditic, so any two can be connected. Several US Department of Defense specifications and military specifications apply to TFOCA, including DOD-1678, MIL-C-83526/12-01, and MIL-STD-810C. Normal (civilian) fiber-optic connectors are much less expensive but require a variety of specialized tools to assemble.
