= Lapping film =

Abrasive consumable

Lapping film, in telecommunications, is a precision coated abrasive consumable mainly used for processing and polishing optical fiber connectors. It is made from a polyester base sheet, coated with precisely graded minerals such as diamond, aluminium oxide, silicon carbide, silicon oxide or cerium oxide. Lapping film is designed to provide a uniform, consistent finish on optical fiber connector end tips to ensure efficient light/signal transmission. It is available in 0.01-45 μm grades, with or without pressure-sensitive adhesive (PSA) backing.
