= Buffer (optical fiber) =

Protective layer covering an optical fiber

In a fiber optic cable, a buffer is a component that encapsulates one or more optical fibers to provide mechanical isolation and protection from physical damage. Buffers in multi-fiber cables are typically color coded to allow the individual fibers to be identified.

The buffer may take the form of a miniature conduit contained within the cable, called a "loose buffer", or "loose buffer tube". In contrast, a "tight buffer" consists of a polymer coating in intimate contact with the primary coating applied to the fiber during manufacture.

A loose buffer may contain more than one fiber, and sometimes contains a gel that lubricates the fiber and prevents water from intruding into the tube. Loose tubes help isolate fibers from tension when the cable is being pulled through a conduit. In the field, loose-tube single-mode fibers are commonly terminated by splicing to pigtails.

Buffers may be applied to optical fiber by spraying, dipping, extrusion and electrostatic methods. Materials used to create buffers can include fluoropolymers such as polyvinylidene fluoride (Kynar), polytetrafluoroethylene (Teflon), or polyurethane.

== See also ==
- Core (optical fiber)
- Cladding (optical fiber)
