= Optical fiber connector =

Device used to join fiber optic strands in communication systems

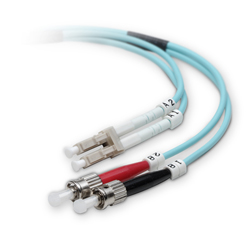
LC (top) and ST (bottom) optical fiber connectors, both with protective caps in place

An optical fiber connector is a device used to link optical fibers, facilitating the efficient transmission of light signals. An optical fiber connector enables quicker connection and disconnection than splicing.

They come in various types like SC, LC, ST, and MTP, each designed for specific applications. In all, about 100 different types of fiber optic connectors have been introduced to the market.

These connectors include components such as ferrules and alignment sleeves for precise fiber alignment. Quality connectors lose very little light due to reflection or misalignment of the fibers.

Optical fiber connectors are categorized into single-mode and multimode types based on their distinct characteristics. Industry standards ensure compatibility among different connector types and manufacturers. These connectors find applications in telecommunications, data centers, and industrial settings.

== Application ==
Optical fiber connectors are used to join optical fibers where a connect/disconnect capability is required. Due to the polishing and tuning procedures that may be incorporated into optical connector manufacturing, connectors are often assembled onto optical fiber in a supplier's manufacturing facility. However, the assembly and polishing operations involved can be performed in the field, for example, to terminate long runs at a patch panel.

Optical fiber connectors are used in telephone exchanges, for customer premises wiring, and in outside plant applications to connect equipment and fiber-optic cables, or to cross-connect cables.

Most optical fiber connectors are spring-loaded, so the fiber faces are pressed together when the connectors are mated. The resulting glass-to-glass or plastic-to-plastic contact eliminates signal losses that would be caused by an air gap between the joined fibers.

Performance of optical fiber connectors can be quantified by insertion loss and return loss. Measurements of these parameters are now defined in IEC standard 61753-1. The standard gives five grades for insertion loss from A (best) to D (worst), and M for multimode. The other parameter is return loss, with grades from 1 (best) to 5 (worst).

A variety of optical fiber connectors are available, but SC and LC connectors are the most common types of connectors on the market. Typical connectors are rated for 500–1,000 mating cycles. The main differences among types of connectors are dimensions and methods of mechanical coupling. Generally, organizations will standardize on one kind of connector, depending on what equipment they commonly use.

In many data center applications, small (e.g., LC) and multi-fiber (e.g., MTP/MPO) connectors have replaced larger, older styles (e.g., SC), allowing more fiber ports per unit of rack space.

Outside plant applications may require connectors be located underground, or on outdoor walls or utility poles. In such settings, protective enclosures are often used, and fall into two broad categories: hermetic (sealed) and free-breathing. Hermetic cases prevent entry of moisture and air but, lacking ventilation, can become hot if exposed to sunlight or other sources of heat. Free-breathing enclosures, on the other hand, allow ventilation, but can also admit moisture, insects and airborne contaminants. Selection of the correct housing depends on the cable and connector type, the location, and environmental factors.

== Types ==
Many types of optical connector have been developed at different times, and for different purposes. Many of them are summarized in the tables below.

Fiber connector types
Short name	Full name	Coupling type	Screw thread	Ferrule diameter	Standard	Applications and notes	Image
Avio (Avim)	Aviation Intermediate Maintenance	Screw				Aerospace and avionics	
ADT-UNI		Screw		2.5 mm		Measurement equipment	
CS	Corning/Senko	Latch, push-pull	—N/a	1.25 mm		Listed in SFF-8024	
DMI	Diamond Micro Interface	Latch, separate	—N/a	2.5 mm		Printed circuit boards	
LSH or E-2000		Latch, push-pull, integral dust cap	—N/a	2.5 mm	IEC 61754-15	Telecom, DWDM systems	
EC; CF08		Latch, push-pull	—N/a		IEC 1754-8	Telecom and CATV networks	
ELIO		Bayonet	—N/a	2.5 mm	ABS1379	PC or UPC	
ESCON	Enterprise Systems Connection	Latch, integral shroud	—N/a	2.5 mm		IBM mainframe computers and peripherals	
F07				2.5 mm	Japanese Industrial Standard (JIS)	LAN, audio systems; for 200 μm fibers, simple field termination possible, mates with ST connectors	
F-3000		Latch, integral light- and dust-cap	—N/a	1.25 mm	IEC 61754-20	Fiber To The Home (LC compatible)	
FC	Ferrule Connector or Fiber Channel	Screw	M8×0.75	2.5 mm	IEC 61754-13	Datacom, telecom, measurement equipment, single-mode lasers (Note: FC connectors' floating ferrule provides good mechanical isolation. FC connectors need to be mated more carefully than the push-pull types due to the need to align the key, and due to the risk of scratching the fiber end face while inserting the ferrule into the jack. An FC connector should not be used in vibrating environments due to its threaded lock. FC connectors have been replaced in many applications by SC and LC connectors.) (Note: There are two incompatible standards for key widths on FC/APC and polarization-maintaining FC/PC connectors: 2 mm (reduced or type R) and 2.14 mm (NTT or type N). Connectors and receptacles with different key widths either cannot be mated, or will not preserve the angle alignment between the fibers, which is especially important for polarization-maintaining fiber. Some manufacturers mark reduced keys with a single scribe mark on the key and mark NTT connectors with a double scribe mark.)	
Fibergate		Latch, integral dust-cap	—N/a	1.25 mm		Backplane connector	
FJ	Fiber-Jack or Opti-Jack	Latch	—N/a	2.5 mm		Building wiring, wall outlets	
LC	Lucent Connector, Little Connector, or Local Connector	Latch	—N/a	1.25 mm	IEC 61754-20	High-density connections, SFP and SFP+ transceivers, XFP transceivers. Duplex LC is comparable in size to RJ-45. (Note: LC connectors have replaced SC connectors in corporate networking environments due to their smaller size; they are often found on Small Form-factor Pluggable transceivers.)	
Luxcis				1.25 mm	ARINC 801	PC (straight physical contact) or APC (angled physical contact) configurations	
LX-5		Latch, integral light- and dust-cap	—N/a		IEC 61754-23	High-density connections; rarely used	
M12-FO		Screw	M16	2.5 mm	EN 61754-27, ISO/IEC 61754-27	Machine, process and plant engineering. IP-67 dust and water resistant	
MIC; FDDI	Media Interface Connector; Fiber distributed data interface	Snap	—N/a	2.5 mm			
MPO or; MTP	Multiple-fiber Push-On/Pull-off	Snap, push-pull, gendered	—N/a	2.5×6.4 mm	IEC-61754-7; EIA/TIA-604-5 (FOCIS 5)	SM or MM multi-fiber ribbon. Same ferrule as MT, but more easily reconnectable. Used for indoor cabling and device interconnections. MTP is a brand name for an improved connector, which intermates with MPO. (Note: MPO (Multi-fiber Push On) is a connector for ribbon cables with four to twenty-four fibers. Connectors for single-mode fiber have angled ends to minimize back-reflection, while multimode fiber versions typically have flat ends. MTP is a brand name for a version of the MPO connector with improved specifications. MTP and MPO connectors intermate.)	
MT	Mechanical Transfer	Latch, gendered	—N/a	2.5×6.4 mm		Pre-terminated cable assemblies; outdoor applications	
MT-RJ	Mechanical Transfer Registered Jack or Media Termination - recommended jack	Latch, gendered	—N/a	2.45×4.4 mm	IEC 61754-18	Duplex multimode connections (Note: MT-RJ (Mechanical Transfer Registered Jack) uses a form factor and latch similar to the 8P8C (RJ45) connectors. Two separate fibers are included in one unified connector. It is easier to terminate and install than ST or SC connectors. The smaller size allows twice the port density on a faceplate than ST or SC connectors do. The MT-RJ connector was designed by AMP, but was later standardized as FOCIS 12 (Fiber Optic Connector Intermateability Standards) in EIA/TIA-604-12. There are two variations: pinned and no-pin. The pinned variety, which has two small stainless steel guide pins on the face of the connector, is used in patch panels to mate with the no-pin connectors on MT-RJ patch cords.)	
MU	Miniature unit	Latch, push-pull	—N/a	1.25 mm	IEC 61754-6	Common in Japan	
SC	Subscriber connector, square connector or standard connector	Latch, push-pull	—N/a	2.5 mm	IEC 61754-4	Datacom and telecom (most widely deployed); GPON; EPON; GBIC; MADI; BiDi (Note: The push-pull design on SC connectors reduces the chance of fiber end face contact damage during connection. These are frequently found on older networking gear using GBICs.)	
SC-DC; SC-QC	SC-Dual Contact; SC-Quattro Contact	Latch, push-pull	—N/a	2.5 mm	IEC 61754-4	Datacom and telecom; GPON; EPON; GBIC	
SMA 905 (Note: SMA is short for subminiature assembly.); F-SMA I	Sub Miniature A	Screw, optionally keyed	1/4″-36 UNS 2B	3.17 mm	IEC 60874-2	Industrial lasers, optical spectrometers, military; telecom multimode (Note: The SMA connector was the first widely used standard connector, developed in the 1970s by Amphenol using the design geometry of the SMA RF connector. It was designed for large-diameter multimode fiber applications, for which it is still widely used in industry and medicine. It lacks features important to communications applications, for which it is considered obsolete.)	
SMA 906; F-SMA II	Sub Miniature A	Screw	1/4″-36 UNS 2B	Stepped; 0.118 to 0.089 in 3.0 to 2.3 mm, typ.	IEC 60874-2	Industrial lasers, military; telecom multimode	
SMC	Sub Miniature C	Snap	—N/a	2.5 mm			
ST or; BFOC	Straight Tip (Note: ST refers to a straight tip, as the sides of the ceramic tip are parallel—as opposed to the predecessor bi-conic connector which aligned as two nesting ice cream cones would.) or Bayonet Fiber Optic Connector	Bayonet	—N/a	2.5 mm	IEC 61754-2	Datacom (Note: An ST connector has a key which prevents rotation of the ceramic ferrule, and a bayonet lock similar to a BNC shell. The single index tab must be properly aligned with a slot on the mating receptacle before insertion; then the bayonet interlock can be engaged, by pushing and twisting, locking at the end of travel, which maintains spring-loaded engagement force on the core optical junction.)	
F05		Snap-in, clip	—N/a		JIS C 5974	Digital audio, used in select TOSLINK devices	
VF-45; SG	Volition Fiber	Latch	—N/a	None, V-grooves as guidance		Datacom	
1053 HDTV	Broadcast connector interface	Push-pull coupling	—N/a	1.25 mm ceramic		Audio & data (broadcasting)	
V-PIN	V-System	Snap-fit, push-pull	—N/a			Industrial and electric utility networking; multimode 200 μm, 400 μm, 1 mm, 2.2 mm fibers	
MMC	Miniature multifiber connector	Push-pull		6.33mm × 1.83mm		Data centers	

=== Obsolete connectors ===
Obsolete fiber connector types
Short name	Long name	Coupling type	Screw thread	Ferrule diameter	Standard	Applications and notes	Image
Biconic		Screw		2.5 mm	TIA-604-1	Telecom in the 1980s	
D4 (NEC)		Screw		2.0 mm		Telecom between the 1970s and early 1990s	
Deutsch 1000		Screw				Telecom	
DIN (LSA)		Screw		2.0 mm	IEC 61754-3	Telecom in Germany in 1990s, measurement equipment	
OPTIMATE		Screw				Plastic fiber	
OptoClip II		Snap (push-pull coupling)	—N/a	None - bare fiber used	Proprietary Huber & Suhner	Datacom and telecom, last made in 2005	

=== Contact ===
Modern connectors typically use a physical contact polish on the fiber and ferrule end. This is a slightly convex surface with the apex of the curve accurately centered on the fiber, so that when the connectors are mated the fiber cores come into direct contact with one another. Some manufacturers have several grades of polish quality, for example a regular FC connector may be designated FC/PC (for physical contact), while FC/SPC and FC/UPC may denote super and ultra polish qualities, respectively. Higher grades of polish give less insertion loss and lower back reflection.

Many connectors are available with the fiber end face polished at an angle to prevent light that reflects from the interface from traveling back up the fiber. Because of the angle, the reflected light does not stay in the fiber core but instead leaks out into the cladding. Angle-polished connectors should only be mated to other angle-polished connectors. The APC angle is normally 8 degrees; however, SC/APC also exists at 9 degrees in some countries. Mating to a non-angle polished connector causes very high insertion loss. Generally, angle-polished connectors have higher insertion loss than good-quality straight physical contact ones. "Ultra" quality connectors may achieve comparable back reflection to an angled connector when connected, but an angled connection maintains low back reflection even when the output end of the fiber is disconnected.

Angle-polished connections are distinguished visibly by the use of a green strain relief boot, or a green connector body. The parts are typically identified by adding "/APC" (angled physical contact) to the name. For example, an angled FC connector may be designated FC/APC, or merely FCA. Non-angled versions may be denoted FC/PC or with specialized designations such as FC/UPC or FCU to denote an "ultra" quality polish on the fiber end face. Two different versions of FC/APC exist: FC/APC-N (NTT) and FC/APC-R (Reduced). An FC/APC-N connector key will not fit into a FC/APC-R adapter key slot.

=== Field-mountable connectors ===
Field-mountable optical fiber connectors are used to join optical fiber jumper cables that contain one single-mode fiber. Field-mountable optical fiber connectors are used for field restoration work and to eliminate the need to stock jumper cords of various sizes.

These assemblies can be separated into two major categories: single-jointed connector assemblies and multiple-jointed connector assemblies. According to Telcordia GR-1081, a single-jointed connector assembly is a connector assembly where there is only one spot where two different fibers are joined together. This is the situation generally found when connector assemblies are made from factory-assembled optical fiber connector plugs. A multiple-jointed connector assembly is a connector assembly where there is more than one closely spaced connection joining different fibers together. An example of a multiple-jointed connector assembly is a connector assembly that uses the stub-fiber type of connector plug.

== Attributes ==
Features of good connector design:

- Low insertion loss - should not exceed 0.75 dB
- Typical insertion repeatability, the difference in insertion loss between one plugging and another, is 0.2 dB.
- High return loss (low amounts of reflection at the interface) - should be higher than 20 dB
- Ease of installation
- Low cost
- Reliability
- Low environmental sensitivity
- Ease of use

== Analysis ==
- On all connectors, cleaning the ceramic ferrule before each connection helps prevent scratches and extends the connector life substantially.
- Connectors on polarization-maintaining fiber are sometimes marked with a blue strain relief boot or connector body. Sometimes a blue buffer tube is used on the fiber instead.
- Hardened Fiber Optic Connectors (HFOCs) and Hardened Fiber Optic Adapters (HFOAs) are passive telecommunications components used in an outside plant environment. They provide drop connections to customers from fiber distribution networks. These components may be provided in pedestal closures, (Note: Pedestal terminal closures are intended to house passive telecommunications components used in an Outside Plant (OSP) environment. According to Telcordia GR-13 , these closures may house such components as copper terminal blocks, coaxial taps, or passive fiber optic distribution equipment used for the distribution of telephone service and broadband services.) aerial and buried closures and terminals, or equipment located at customer premises such as a Fiber Distribution Hub (FDH) or an optical network terminal unit.

These connectors, which are field-mateable and hardened for use in the OSP, are needed to support Fiber to the Premises (FTTP) deployment and service offerings. HFOCs are designed to withstand climatic conditions existing throughout the U.S., including rain, flooding, snow, sleet, high winds, and ice and sand storms. Ambient temperatures ranging from −40 °C (−40 °F) to 70 °C (158 °F) can be encountered.
Telcordia GR-3120 contains the industry’s most recent generic requirements for HFOCs and HFOAs.

== Testing ==
Glass fiber optic connector performance is affected both by the connector and by the glass fiber. Concentricity tolerances affect the fiber, fiber core, and connector body. The core optical index of refraction is also subject to variations. Stress in the polished fiber can cause excess return loss. The fiber can slide along its length in the connector. The shape of the connector tip may be incorrectly profiled during polishing. The connector manufacturer has little control over these factors, so in-service performance may well be below the manufacturer's specification.

Testing fiber optic connector assemblies falls into two general categories: factory testing and field testing.

Factory testing is sometimes statistical, for example, a process check. A profiling system may be used to ensure the overall polished shape is correct, and a good quality optical microscope to check for blemishes. Insertion loss and return loss performance are checked using specific reference conditions, against a reference-standard single-mode test lead, or using an encircled flux compliant source for multi-mode testing. Testing and rejection (yield) may represent a significant part of the overall manufacturing cost.

Field testing is usually simpler. A special hand-held optical microscope is used to check for dirt or blemishes. A power meter and light source or an optical loss test set (OLTS) is used to test end-to-end loss, and an optical time-domain reflectometer may be used to identify significant point losses or return losses.

== See also ==
- Gap loss – attenuation sources and causes
- Index-matching material – a liquid/gel to reduce Fresnel reflection
- Mechanical splice – a more permanent, but still mechanical connection
- Optical attenuator – fiber optic attenuator
