= Optical attenuator =

Device used to reduce the power level of an optical signal

Variable Optical Attenuator

An optical attenuator, or fiber optic attenuator, is a device used to reduce the power level of an optical signal, either in free space or in an optical fiber. The basic types of optical attenuators are fixed, step-wise variable, and continuously variable.

== Applications ==
Optical attenuators are commonly used in fiber-optic communications, either to test power level margins by temporarily adding a calibrated amount of signal loss, or installed permanently to properly match transmitter and receiver levels. Sharp bends stress optic fibers and can cause losses. If a received signal is too strong a temporary fix is to wrap the cable around a pencil until the desired level of attenuation is achieved. However, such arrangements are unreliable, since the stressed fiber tends to break over time. Generally, multimode systems do not need attenuators as the multimode sources, rarely have enough power output to saturate receivers. Instead, single-mode systems, especially the long-haul DWDM network links, often need to use fiber optic attenuators to adjust the optical power during the transmission.

== Principles of operation ==
The power reduction is done by such means as absorption, reflection, diffusion, scattering, deflection, diffraction, and dispersion, etc. Optical attenuators usually work by absorbing the light, like sunglasses absorb extra light energy. They typically have a working wavelength range in which they absorb all light energy equally. They should not reflect the light or scatter the light in an air gap, since that could cause unwanted back reflection in the fiber system. Another type of attenuator utilizes a length of high-loss optical fiber, that operates upon its input optical signal power level in such a way that its output signal power level is less than the input level.

== Types ==
Optical attenuators can take a number of different forms and are typically classified as fixed or variable attenuators. What's more, they can be classified as LC, SC, ST, FC, MU, E2000 etc. according to the different types of connectors.

=== Fixed Attenuators ===
Fixed optical attenuators used in fiber optic systems may use a variety of principles for their functioning. Preferred attenuators use either doped fibers, or mis-aligned splices, or total power since both of these are reliable and inexpensive. Inline style attenuators are incorporated into patch cables. The alternative build out style attenuator is a small male-female adapter that can be added onto other cables.

Non-preferred attenuators often use gap loss or reflective principles. Such devices can be sensitive to: modal distribution, wavelength, contamination, vibration, temperature, damage due to power bursts, may cause back reflections, may cause signal dispersion etc.

=== Loopback attenuators ===
Loopback fiber optic attenuator is designed for testing, engineering and the burn-in stage of boards or other equipment. Available in SC/UPC, SC/APC, LC/UPC, LC/APC, MTRJ, MPO for singlemode application.900 um fiber cable inside of the black shell for LC and SC type. No black shell for MTRJ and MPO type.

=== Built-in variable attenuators ===
Built-in variable optical attenuators may be either manually or electrically controlled. A manual device is useful for one-time set up of a system, and is a near-equivalent to a fixed attenuator, and may be referred to as an "adjustable attenuator". In contrast, an electrically controlled attenuator can provide adaptive power optimization.

Attributes of merit for electrically controlled devices, include speed of response and avoiding degradation of the transmitted signal. Dynamic range is usually quite restricted, and power feedback may mean that long term stability is a relatively minor issue. Speed of response is a particularly major issue in dynamically reconfigurable systems, where a delay of one millionth of a second can result in the loss of large amounts of transmitted data. Typical technologies employed for high speed response include liquid crystal variable attenuator (LCVA), or lithium niobate devices. There is a class of built-in attenuators that is technically indistinguishable from test attenuators, except they are packaged for rack mounting, and have no test display.

=== Variable optical test attenuators ===
Variable optical test attenuators generally use a variable neutral density filter. Despite relatively high cost, this arrangement has the advantages of being stable, wavelength insensitive, mode insensitive, and offering a large dynamic range. Other schemes such as LCD, variable air gap etc. have been tried over the years, but with limited success.

They may be either manually or motor controlled. Motor control give regular users a distinct productivity advantage, since commonly used test sequences can be run automatically.

Attenuator instrument calibration is a major issue. The user typically would like an absolute port to port calibration. Also, calibration should usually be at a number of wavelengths and power levels, since the device is not always linear. However a number of instruments do not in fact offer these basic features, presumably in an attempt to reduce cost. The most accurate variable attenuator instruments have thousands of calibration points, resulting in excellent overall accuracy in use.

== Test automation ==
Test sequences that use variable attenuators can be very time-consuming. Therefore, automation is likely to achieve useful benefits. Both bench and handheld-style devices are available that offer such features.

== See also ==
- Gap loss - sources and causes of unintended attenuation
- Optical fiber cable
- Optical fiber connector
- Optical power meter
