= Fischer Connectors =

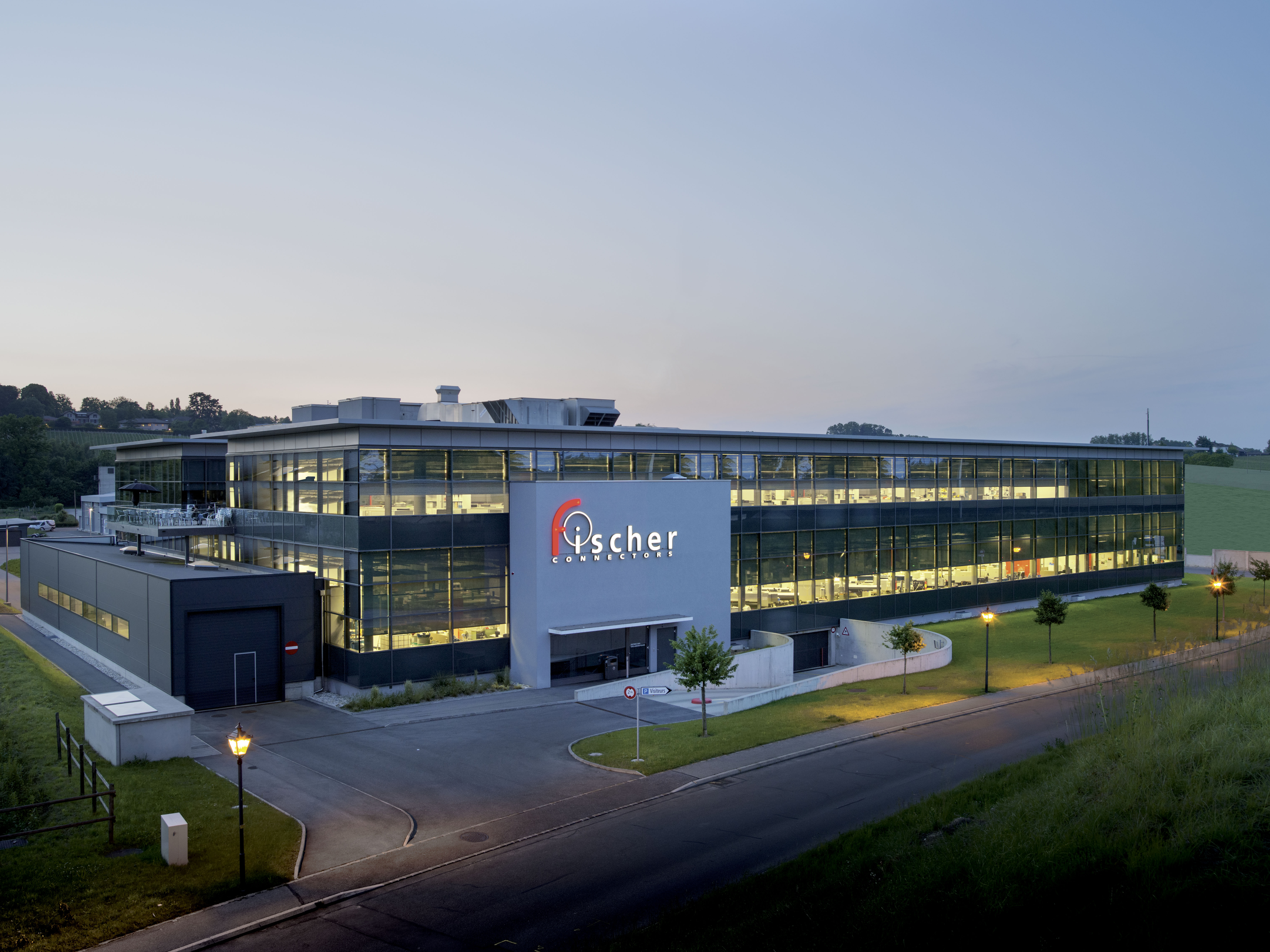
Fischer Connectors’s main production site in Saint-Prex, Switzerland (2013)

Fischer Connectors is a Swiss multinational company that designs, manufactures and distributes electrical connectors and optical fiber connectors, cable assemblies and electronic and connectivity systems. Founded in 1954, the company has its main manufacturing facility and R&D Center in Saint-Prex, Switzerland, and eight subsidiaries employing 550 people worldwide (including 300 at the group headquarters in Saint-Prex), with cable assembly facilities in Europe, North America and Asia Pacific. Fischer Connectors is part of Conextivity Group.

Fischer Connectors’s five product lines include electrical and optical fiber (3rd rank from the left) connectors and cable assemblies in different materials and configurations.

== History ==
Walter Werner Fischer, a Swiss engineer, founded the company in 1954 in Morges, Switzerland. The company developed the first sealed connector and, in 1962, took out an international patent on its proprietary push-pull locking system. In 1964 it developed a hermetic connector. Overseas expansion started with the first subsidiary being established in the UK in 1988, followed by other European countries, North America in 1991 and the first Asian subsidiary in Hong Kong in 2000. In 2017, the company opened a subsidiary in Tokyo, Japan. In 1996, Walter Werner Fischer's son, Peter Fischer, was named CEO. In 2016, Jonathan Brossard, a 3rd-generation member of the Fischer family, was appointed CEO.

At the 2013 International Broadcasting Convention (IBC), the Fischer FiberOptic Series won a 'Best of IBC' Award in the category production and infrastructure. In 2017, Fischer Connectors became partner to SolarStratos, an aeronautical project that aims to fly the first solar-powered airplane to the stratosphere. In the PriceWaterHouseCoopers Study presented at the 18th Swiss Economic Forum in Interlaken on June 1, 2017, Fischer Connectors was designated Swiss Champion 2017 for its Industry 4.0 approach. In 2018, CEO Jonathan Brossard was named by Ernst & Young as a finalist of the EY Entrepreneur of the Year competition for Switzerland in the Family Business category.

The Fischer LP360 connector, the first product of the Fischer Freedom Series launched in 2018, won four awards in one year for its technological innovation: the Innovators Award (Platinum) from Military & Aerospace Electronics in the interconnect technology category, and the Leadership in Engineering Achievement Program (LEAP) Award from Design World in the connectivity category, the Electrons d'Or, and the Electronics Industry Award and the Red Dot Award for Product Design in two categories: the “Mobile Phones, Tablets and Wearables” category, and the “Smart Products” meta-category.

In 2019, the Fischer Connectors Group created the spin-off Wearin'. Wearin' creates Internet of Things (IoT) wearable solutions that enhance safety and efficiency by improving situational awareness and by enabling a better coordination of connected humans such as lone workers, firefighters and first responders. It makes high-risk work environments safer and smarter with real-time insights from user-generated field data.

New products were also launched in 2020 to integrate connectors and cable assemblies into portable and wearable flexible structures. Since February 2022, Fischer Connectors has been partnering with SP80 to provide connectivity solutions supporting the transmission of sensor data for the wind-powered boat setting out to reach the sailing speed of 80 knots.

In 2022, the founding family Fischer created the technology group Conextivity to meet the connectivity challenge posed by the emergence of new cross-functional and scalable ecosystems, from locally interconnected devices and sensors to cloud-managed IoT platforms. Conextivity Group comprises two business activities: Fischer Connectors and Wearin’.

== Operations ==
Fischer Connectors’ products are used in aerospace, broadcast, defense, energy, food, industrial, instrumentation, marine, medical, nuclear, oil and gas, pharmaceutical, robotics, security, sensors, unmanned aerial vehicles (UAVs), underwater, transportation and vacuum applications.

Fischer Connectors’ range of products includes over 30,000 standard electrical, optical and hybrid connectors – low/high voltage, coax/triax, push-pull, circular, fluid/gas – and electrical, single pair Ethernet and optical cable assemblies organized across five product lines engineered to fulfill needs in terms of high-reliability connectivity, miniaturization, high-speed data transmission, IP68 and IP69 sealing and wearability. Fischer Connectors’ electronic products include flex circuits for military radio units, nuclear control instruments and racing car dashboards; adapter modules for USB-Ethernet radios, computer peripherals and medical scanners; unmanaged PoE+ switches and managed switches with Time-Sensitive Networking (TSN) technology for military, industrial and maritime applications; rugged flash drives for ruggedized computers, motorsports, UAVs and dismounted soldier systems; visible low-light cameras for security, vehicle identification and emergency services equipment; tactical power and data hubs for sights, radios, displays and batteries body-worn by dismounted soldiers and security officers.

Connectors are produced in different materials such as brass, stainless steel, aluminum and plastic. Their design and configurations vary from miniature and high-density signal and power connectors to compact, rugged, sealed and hermetic seal connectors made to withstand extreme conditions, such as low and high temperatures, vibration, shock, corrosion, chemicals and radiation.

In 2018, Fischer Connectors launched the Fischer Freedom Series, a new product line featuring a plug and use connector with 360° mating and a low profile for integration into wearable devices and various applications in the Internet of Things. The new connector won five innovation awards including the Red Dot Award for Product Design, and the first patent protecting its innovative design was granted in the United States in February 2020.

Fischer Connectors’ finished products include ruggedized flash drives for data transfer and storage. The company also provides customized products for design engineers’ projects requiring non-standard specifications.

Fischer Connectors’ products comply with international quality standards, including ISO 9001, ISO 13485, ISO 14001, OHSAS 18001, REACH and RoHS. With its manufacturing facility in Saint-Prex, Fischer Connectors has become over the years a model for the Industry 4.0.
