= Fiber-optic adapter =

Device to connect two fiber optic lines

A fiber-optic adapter connects two optical fiber connectors in the fiber optic lines.

== Bare fiber adapter ==
Bare fiber adapter is used as the medium to temporarily link the bare optical fiber to fiber optic equipment. Available with FC, SC, ST. LC, MU, SMA connectors with round or square type press button.

== Couplers ==
A fiber optic coupler is a device used in optical fiber systems with one or more input fibers and one or several output fibers. Light entering an input fiber can appear at one or more outputs and its spectral power distribution potentially depending on the wavelength and polarization. Such couplers can be fabricated in different ways, for example by thermally fusing fibers so that their cores get into intimate contact. If all involved fibers are single-mode (supporting only a single mode per polarization direction for a given wavelength), there are certain physical restrictions on the performance of the coupler. In particular, it is not possible to combine two or more inputs of the same optical frequency into one single-polarization output without significant excess losses. However, such a restriction does not occur for different input wavelengths: there are couplers that can combine two inputs at different wavelengths into one output without exhibiting significant losses. Wavelength-sensitive couplers are used as multiplexers in wavelength-division multiplexing (WDM) telecom systems to combine several input channels with different wavelengths, or to separate channels.
