= Extinction ratio =

Concept of this parameter

Eye diagram showing an example of two power levels in an OOK modulation scheme, which can be used to calculate extinction ratio. P_{1} and P_{0} are represented by (binary 1) and (binary 0) respectively.

In telecommunications, extinction ratio (r_{e}) is the ratio of two optical power levels of a digital signal generated by an optical source, e.g., a laser diode. The extinction ratio may be expressed as a fraction, in dB, or as a percentage. It may be given by

$$r_e = \frac{P_1}{P_0},$$

where P_{1} is the optical power level generated when the light source is on, and P_{0} is the power level generated when the light source is off.

The polarization extinction ratio (PER) is the ratio of optical powers of perpendicular polarizations, usually called TE (transverse electric) and TM (transverse magnetic). In telecommunications, the PER is used to characterize the degree of polarization in a polarization-maintaining device polarization-maintaining optical fiber. For coherent transmitter and receiver, the PER is a key parameter, since X polarization and Y polarization are coded with different signals.
