= Optical power meter =

Device used to measure power in an optical signal

An optical power meter (OPM) is a device used to measure the power in an optical signal. The term usually refers to a device used for measuring the average power in fiber optic systems. Other general purpose light power measuring devices are usually called radiometers, photometers, laser power meters (can be photodiode sensors or thermopile laser sensors), light meters or lux meters.

A typical optical power meter consists of a calibrated sensor, a measuring amplifier and a display. The sensor primarily consists of a photodiode selected for the appropriate ranges of wavelengths and power levels. On the display unit, the measured optical power and set wavelength is displayed. Power meters are calibrated using a traceable calibration standard.

A traditional optical power meter responds to a broad spectrum of light, however, the calibration is wavelength dependent. This is not normally an issue, since the test wavelength is usually known, but has some drawbacks. Firstly, the user must set the meter to the correct test wavelength, and secondly, the presence of spurious wavelengths can result in wrong readings.

Optical power meters are available as stand-alone bench or handheld instruments or combined with other test functions such as an Optical Light Source (OLS), Visual Fault Locator (VFL), or as a sub-system in a larger or modular instrument. Commonly, a power meter on its own is used to measure absolute optical power, or used with a matched light source to measure loss.

When combined with a light source, the instrument is called an Optical Loss Test Set, or OLTS, and is typically used to measure optical power and end-to-end optical loss. More advanced OLTS may incorporate two or more power meters, and so can measure Optical Return Loss. GR-198, Generic Requirements for Hand-Held Stabilized Light Sources, Optical Power Meters, Reflectance Meters, and Optical Loss Test Sets, discusses OLTS equipment in depth.

Alternatively, an Optical Time Domain Reflectometer (OTDR) can indirectly measure the optical link loss if its markers are set at the terminus points for which the fiber loss is desired. Such a single-direction measurement may quite inaccurate if there are multiple fibers in a link, since the back-scatter coefficient is variable between fibers. Accuracy can be increased if a bidirectional average is made. GR-196, Generic Requirements for Optical Time Domain Reflectometer (OTDR) Type Equipment, discusses OTDR equipment in depth.

== Sensors ==
The major semiconductor sensor types are Silicon (Si), Germanium (Ge) and Indium Gallium Arsenide (InGaAs). Additionally, these may be used with attenuating elements for high optical power testing, or wavelength selective elements so they only respond to particular wavelengths. These all operate in a similar type of circuit, however, in addition to their basic wavelength response characteristics, each one has some other particular characteristics:

- Si detectors tend to saturate at relatively low power levels, and they are only useful in the visible and 850 nm bands, where they offer generally good performance.
- Ge detectors saturate at the highest power levels, but have poor low power performance, poor general linearity over the entire power range, and are generally temperature sensitive. They are only marginally accurate for "1550 nm" testing, due to a combination of temperature and wavelength affecting responsivity at e.g. 1580 nm, however they provide useful performance over the commonly used 850 / 1300 / 1550 nm wavelength bands, so they are extensively deployed where lower accuracy is acceptable. Other limitations include: non-linearity at low power levels, and poor responsivity uniformity across the detector area.
- InGaAs detectors saturate at intermediate levels. They offer generally good performance, but are often very wavelength sensitive around 850 nm. So they are largely used for single-mode fiber testing at 1270 - 1650 nm.

An important part of an optical power meter sensor is the fiber optic connector interface. Careful optical design is required to avoid significant accuracy problems when used with the wide variety of fiber types and connectors typically encountered.

Another important component is the sensor input amplifier. This needs very careful design to avoid significant performance degradation over a wide range of conditions.

== Power measuring range ==
A typical OPM is linear from about 0 dBm (1 milli Watt) to about -50 dBm (10 nano Watt), although the display range may be larger. Above 0 dBm is considered "high power", and specially adapted units may measure up to nearly + 30 dBm ( 1 Watt). Below -50 dBm is "low power", and specially adapted units may measure as low as -110 dBm. Irrespective of power meter specifications, testing below about -50 dBm tends to be sensitive to stray ambient light leaking into fibers or connectors. So when testing at "low power", some sort of test range / linearity verification (easily done with attenuators) is advisable. At low power levels, optical signal measurements tend to become noisy, so meters may become very slow due to use of a significant amount of signal averaging.

To calculate dBm from power meter output : The linear-to-dBm calculation method is: dB = 10 log ( P1 / P2 ) where P1 = measured power level ( e.g. in mWatts ), P2 = reference power level, which is 1 mW

== Calibration and accuracy ==
Optical Power Meter calibration and accuracy is a contentious issue. The accuracy of most primary reference standards (e.g. Weight, Time, Length, Volt, etc.) is known to a high accuracy, typically of the order of 1 part in a billion. However the optical power standards maintained by various National Standards Laboratories, are only defined to about one part in a thousand. By the time this accuracy has been further degraded through successive links, instrument calibration accuracy is usually only a few %. The most accurate field optical power meters claim 1% calibration accuracy. This is orders of magnitude less accurate than a comparable electrical meter.

Calibration processes for optical power meters are given in IEC 61315 Ed. 3.0 b:2019 - Calibration of fibre-optic power meters.

Furthermore, the in-use accuracy achieved is usually significantly lower than the claimed calibration accuracy, by the time additional factors are taken into account. In typical field applications, factors may include: ambient temperature, optical connector type, wavelength variations, linearity variations, beam geometry variations, detector saturation.

Therefore, achieving a good level of practical instrument accuracy and linearity is something that requires design skill, and high manufacturing proficiency.

With the increasing global importance in the reliability of data transmission and optical fiber, and also the sharply reducing optical loss margin of these systems in data centres, there is increased emphasis on the accuracy of optical power meters, and also proper traceability compliance via International Laboratory Accreditation Cooperation (ILAC) accredited calibration, which includes metrological traceability to national standards and external laboratory accreditation to ISO/IEC 17025 to improve confidence in overall accuracy claims.

== Extended sensitivity meters ==
A class of laboratory power meters has an extended sensitivity, of the order of -110 dBm. This is achieved by using a very small detector and lens combination, and also a mechanical light chopper at typically 270 Hz, so the meter actually measures AC light. This eliminates unavoidable dc electrical drift effects. If the light chopping is synchronized with an appropriate synchronous (or "lock-in") amplifier, further sensitivity gains are achieved. In practice, such instruments usually achieve lower absolute accuracy due to the small detector diode, and for the same reason, may only be accurate when coupled with single-mode fiber. Occasionally such an instrument may have a cooled detector, though with the modern abandonment of Germanium sensors, and the introduction of InGaAs sensors, this is now increasingly uncommon.

== Pulse power measurement ==
Optical power meters usually display time-averaged power. So for pulse measurements, the signal duty cycle must be known to calculate the peak power value. However, the instantaneous peak power must be less than the maximum meter reading, or the detector may saturate, resulting in wrong average readings. Also, at low pulse repetition rates, some meters with data or tone detection may produce improper or no readings. A class of "high power" meters has some type of optical attenuating element in front of the detector, typically allowing about a 20 dB increase in maximum power reading. Above this level, an entirely different class of "laser power meter" instrument is used, usually based on thermal detection.

== Common fiber optic test applications ==
- Measuring the absolute power in a fiber optic signal. For this application, the power meter needs to be properly calibrated at the wavelength being tested, and set to this wavelength.
- Measuring the optical loss in a fiber, in combination with a suitable stable light source. Since this is a relative test, accurate calibration is not a particular requirement, unless two or more meters are being used due to distance issues. If a more complex two-way loss test is performed, then power meter calibration can be ignored, even when two meters are used.
- Some instruments are equipped for optical test tone detection, to assist in quick cable continuity testing. Standard test tones are usually 270 Hz, 1 kHz, 2 kHz. Some units can also determine one of 12 tones, for ribbon fiber continuity testing.

== Test automation ==
Typical test automation features usually apply to loss testing applications, and include:

- The ability to set the unit to read 0 dB at a reference power level, typically the test source.
- The ability to store readings into internal memory, for subsequent recall and download to a computer.
- The ability to synchronize the wavelength with a test source, so that the meter sets to the source wavelength. This requires a specifically matched source. The simplest way of achieving this, is by recognizing a test tone, but the best way is by transfer of data. The data method has benefits that the source can send additional useful data such as nominal source power level, serial number etc.

== Wavelength-selective meters ==
An increasingly common special-purpose OPM, commonly called a "PON Power Meter" is designed to hook into a live PON (Passive Optical Network) circuit, and simultaneously test the optical power in different directions and wavelengths. This unit is essentially a triple power meter, with a collection of wavelength filters and optical couplers. Proper calibration is complicated by the varying duty cycle of the measured optical signals. It may have a simple pass/ fail display, to facilitate easy use by operators with little expertise.

Wavelength sensitivity of fiber optic power meter is a problem when using a photodiode for voltage current measurement. If the temperature-sensitive measurement replaces voltage-current measurement by photodiode the wavelength sensitivity of an OPM can be reduced. Thus if the photodiode is reverse biased by a constant voltage source and supplied with constant current, when triggered by light the junction dissipates power. The temperature of the junction rises and the temperature rise measured by thermistor is directly proportional to the Optical power. Due to constant current supply, the reflection of power to photodiode is nearly zero and the transition of electrons between the valence band and the conduction band and vice-versa is stable.

== See also ==
- Optical attenuator
