= Ferrule =

Ring used for fastening or joining

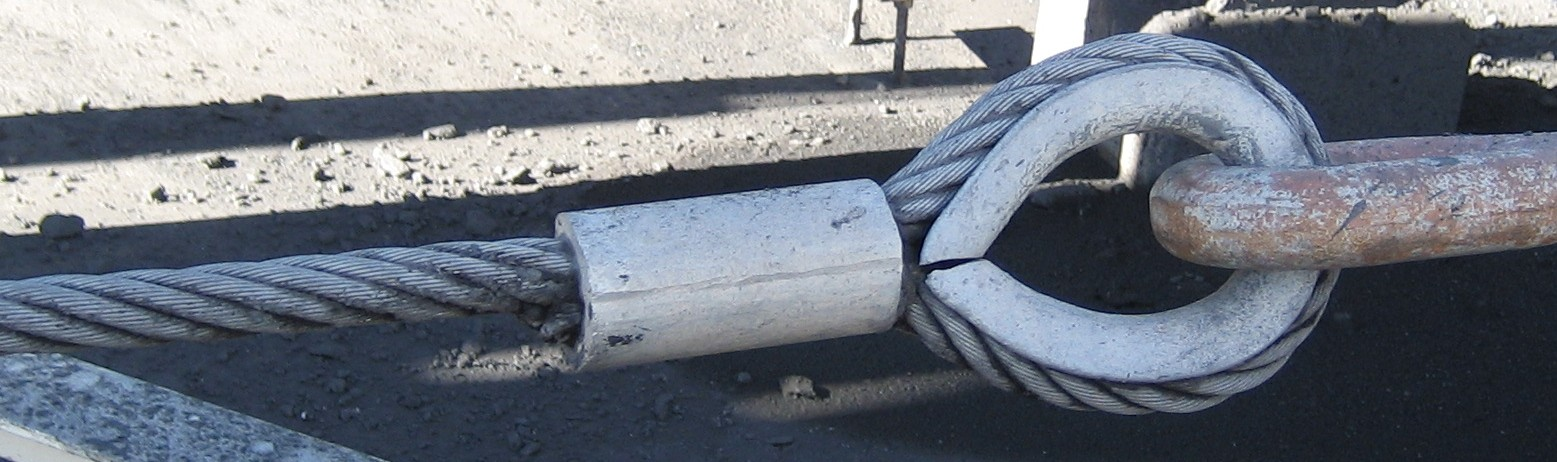
A wire rope terminated with a ferrule (left) and a thimble (right)

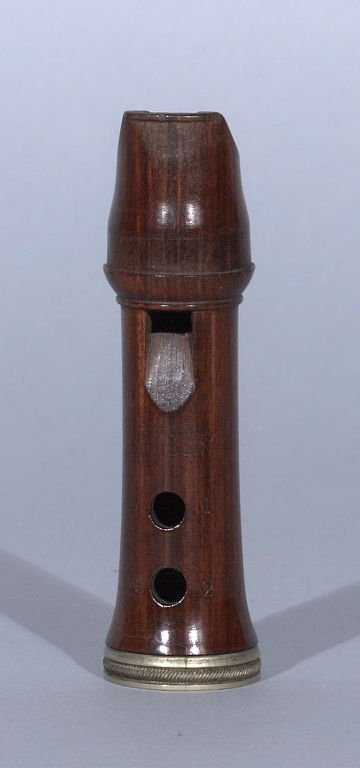
Picco pipe with nickel silver ferrule

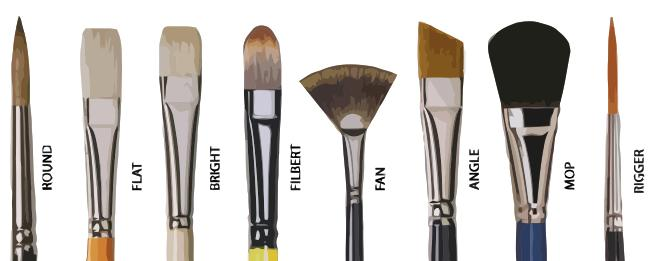
Non-circular ferrules holding bristles of brushes to their handles

A ferrule (a corruption of Latin viriola "small bracelet", under the influence of ferrum "iron") is any of a number of types of objects generally used for fastening, joining, sealing, or reinforcement. They are often narrow circular rings made from metal, or less commonly, plastic. Ferrules are also often referred to as eyelets or grommets within the manufacturing industry.

Most ferrules consist of a circular clamp used to hold together and attach fibers, wires, or posts, generally by crimping, swaging, or otherwise deforming the ferrule to permanently tighten it onto the parts that it holds.

== Examples ==
- The sleeve, usually plastic or metal, on the end of a shoelace, preventing it from unraveling (called the aglet)
- The metal sleeve which is crimped to hold the eraser in place on a pencil
- The metal band that binds the bristles or hair of a brush to its handle
- The metal ring which holds a chisel blade's tang to its handle
- In fiber optic terminations, glass or plastic fibers are bonded to precision ferrule connectors (FCs), also described as fiber channel connectors, and polished for splitting or connecting two fibers together.
- The metal spike at the end of the shaft of an ice axe
- The margin of a cast crown that stabilizes root-canal-treated teeth in restorative dentistry
- A ferrule, in respect to dentistry, is a band that encircles the external dimension of residual tooth structure, not unlike the metal bands that exist around a barrel.
- The bottom end of a flag stick on a golf course, which fits snugly into the hole in a cup
- The plastic sleeve that adorns the bottom of a steel or graphite golf club shaft just above the club head hosel. Originally designed to protect the shaft from damaging vibrations, it is now used mainly for aesthetic purposes.
- The metal band used to prevent the end of a wooden instrument or tool from splitting
- The semi-circular metal band that holds in place the fibers on the frog of a bow for an instrument in the violin family
- Compression fittings for attaching tubing (piping) commonly have ferrules (sometimes called olives, especially in the UK) in them to make a liquid-tight connection
- A swaged termination type for wire rope
- The cap at the end of an umbrella as well as the ring, often crimped, sometimes pinned, that prevents an umbrella's canopy under tension from sliding off the end when open
- The portion of a cue in pool, billiards and snooker that tops the shaft and to which the tip is bonded; historically made of ivory, now typically made of fiberglass, phenolic resin, brass or titanium.
- A joint between sections of a segmented fishing rod
- A metal cap at the end of a cable housing with a hole on a bicycle or motorcycle control cable
- The metal sleeve that connects a hypodermic needle to a plastic Luer taper (which then connects to a syringe or intravenous therapy tubing)
- An electric wire ferrule is a metal tube crimped over stranded wire to secure it within a screw terminal, optionally with electrical insulation protecting any exposed portion of the wire not completely inside the screw terminal post.
- A metal, rubber, plastic cap at the bottom end of a walking stick.
- The metal tip on a staff carrying a flag or guidon that finishes and protects the end of the wooden shaft.

== Reasons for use ==
Some of the reasons people use ferrules include:

- To shield parts or cables from electromagnetic pulses, environmental damage, the elements, thermal factors, and more.
- To cover parts, adding wear resistance, damage protection, or packaging.
- As a connector, to connect wires, structural devices, and systems
- To bind parts together, including bundles of wires, or cloth threads to the end of the mop, as an example.
- To act as conveyance for fluids like oil and water, or for gasses like air.
