= Splicebox =

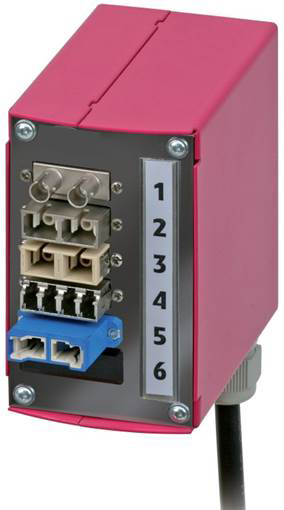
Splicebox with different plugs

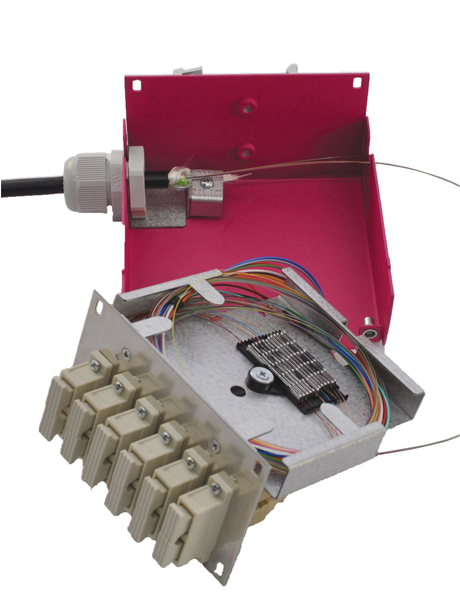
Splicebox with interior splice cassette

A splice box (also known as splice distributor) is a housing in which fiber optic cables begin or end. Fiber optics are fanned out in splice boxes that are situated at the end of fiber optic transmission paths.

The main components of a splice box are the splice cassette that picks up the fibers and their reserves, and the front panel which contains different connectors for transmitting signals via copper or fiber optic cables. The splice cassette is removable in order to assemble fiber optics with a splice unit. The front panel can also be removed to splice the fibers to various connectors.

Since modern splice cassettes already contain a splice tray, a splice holder, couplings and pigtails, the installation of the cables is facilitated. So-called hybrid splice boxes do not only ensure data transmission via copper cables RJ45 or fiber optics, but they also ensure the power supply. That becomes especially important when a splice box needs to be installed in indoor or outdoor applications that are difficult to access.
